

Deaths in July

 1: Don Coryell
 13: George Steinbrenner
 24: Alex Higgins

Current sporting seasons

Australian rules football 2010

Australian Football League

Auto racing 2010

Formula One
Sprint Cup
IRL IndyCar Series
World Rally Championship
Formula Two
Nationwide Series
Camping World Truck Series
GP2 Series
GP3 Series
WTTC
V8 Supercar
American Le Mans
Le Mans Series
Superleague Formula
Rolex Sports Car Series
FIA GT1 World Championship
Formula Three
Auto GP
World Series by Renault
Deutsche Tourenwagen Masters
Super GT

Baseball 2010

Major League Baseball
Nippon Professional Baseball

Basketball 2010

WNBA
Philippines:
Professional: Fiesta Conference
Collegiate/high school: NCAA, UAAP

Canadian football 2010

Canadian Football League

Cricket 2010

England:
County Championship
Clydesdale Bank 40
Friends Provident t20

Association football 2010

National teams competitions
FIFA U-20 Women's World Cup
2011 FIFA Women's World Cup qualification (UEFA)
2011 UEFA European Under-21 Championship qualification
International clubs competitions
UEFA (Europe) Champions League
Europa League
AFC (Asia) Champions League
AFC Cup
CAF (Africa) Champions League
CAF Confederation Cup
CONCACAF (North & Central America) Champions League
Domestic (national) competitions
Brazil
Japan
Norway
Russia
Major League Soccer (USA & Canada)
Women's Professional Soccer (USA)

Golf 2010

PGA Tour
European Tour
LPGA Tour
Champions Tour

Lacrosse 2010

Major League Lacrosse

Motorcycle racing 2010

Moto GP
Superbike World Championship
Supersport racing

Rugby league 2010

Super League
NRL

Rugby union 2010

2011 Rugby World Cup qualifying
Currie Cup
ITM Cup

Snooker

Players Tour Championship

Days of the month

July 31, 2010 (Saturday)

Athletics
European Championships in Barcelona, Spain:
Men:
800m:  Marcin Lewandowski  1:47.07  Michael Rimmer  1:47.17  Adam Kszczot  1:47.22
5000m:  Mo Farah  13:31.18  Jesús España  13:33.12  Hayle Ibrahimov  13:34.15
Farah becomes the fifth winner of the 5000m and 10,000m double at the European Championships.
400m hurdles:  David Greene  48.12  Rhys Williams  48.96  Stanislav Melnykov  49.09
Javelin throw:  Andreas Thorkildsen  88.37 m  Matthias de Zordo  87.81 m  Tero Pitkämäki  86.67 m
Pole vault:  Renaud Lavillenie  5.85 m  Maksym Mazuryk  5.80 m  Przemysław Czerwiński  5.75 m
Shot put:  Andrei Mikhnevich  21.01 m  Tomasz Majewski  21.00 m  Ralf Bartels  20.93 m
Women:
Marathon:  Živilė Balčiūnaitė  2:31:14  Nailiya Yulamanova  2:32:15  Anna Incerti  2:32:48
200m:  Myriam Soumaré  22.32  Yelizaveta Bryzhina  22.44  Aleksandra Fedoriva  22.44
100m hurdles:  Nevin Yanıt  12.63  Derval O'Rourke  12.65  Carolin Nytra  12.68
Triple jump:  Olha Saladukha  14.81 m  Simona La Mantia  14.56 m  Svetlana Bolshakova  14.55 m
Heptathlon:  Jessica Ennis  6823 points  Nataliya Dobrynska  6778  Jennifer Oeser  6683
African Championships in Nairobi, Kenya:
Men:
110m hurdles:  Othman Hadj Lazib  13.77  Selim Nurudeen  13.83  Ruan de Vries  13.98
Hammer throw:  Mohsen Mohamed Anani  74.72 m  Chris Harmse  72.56 m  Mostafa Al-Gamel  71.40 m
Pole vault:  Hamdi Dhouibi  4.70 m  Larbi Bourrada  4.60 m  Mourad Souissi  4.40 m
Triple jump:  Oke Tosin  17.22 m  Hugo Mamba-Schlick  16.78 m  Tumelo Thagane  16.64 m
Women:
10,000m:  Tirunesh Dibaba  31:51.39  Meselech Melkamu  31:55.50  Linet Masai  31:59.36
Javelin throw:  Sunette Viljoen  63.33 m  Justine Robbeson  60.24 m  Hana'a Hassan Omar  55.14 m
Heptathlon:  Margaret Simpson  6031 points  Janet Wienand  5500  Selloane Tsoaeli  5302

Auto racing
Nationwide Series:
U.S. Cellular 250 in Newton, Iowa: (1)  Kyle Busch (Toyota; Joe Gibbs Racing) (2)  Kevin Harvick (Chevrolet; Kevin Harvick Inc.) (3)  Jason Leffler (Toyota; Braun Racing)
Drivers' championship standings (after 21 of 35 races): (1)  Brad Keselowski (Dodge; Penske Racing) 3349 points (2)  Carl Edwards (Ford; Roush Fenway Racing) 3118 (3) Busch 2876
World Rally Championship:
Rally Finland in Jyväskylä: (1) Jari-Matti Latvala  / Miikka Anttila  (Ford Focus RS WRC 09) (2) Sébastien Ogier  / Julien Ingrassia  (Citroën C4 WRC) (3) Sébastien Loeb  / Daniel Elena  (Citroën C4 WRC)
Drivers' championship standings (after 8 of 13 rounds): (1) Loeb 166 points (2) Ogier 118 (3) Latvala 105

Baseball
European Championship in Germany:
Pool C: (teams in bold advance to the final)
 3–11 
 5–14 
 8–0 
Final standings: Italy, Netherlands 4–1, Germany 3–2, Greece, Sweden 2–3, France 0–5.

Basketball
South American Championship in Neiva, Colombia:
7th place playoff:  70–88 
5th place playoff:  86–66 
Bronze medal game:  70–76  
Final:   87–77  
Brazil win the title for the 18th time.
FIBA Europe Under-18 Championship in Lithuania:
Semifinals:
 67–66 
 42–73 
5th–8th Semifinals:
 55–74 
 67–61 
9th place playoff:  74–71 
11th place playoff:  84–59 
Group G:
 49–78 
 104–63 
Standings (after 5 games): Germany 9 points, Ukraine 8, Sweden 7, Bulgaria 6.
Bulgaria is relegated to Division B.
FIBA Europe Under-18 Championship for Women in Slovakia: (teams in bold advance to Qualifying Round)
Group A:
 47–73 
 58–51 
Final standings: Spain 6 points, Slovak Republic 5, Serbia 4, Hungary 3.
Group B:
 81–76 
 72–47 
Final standings: Russia, Slovenia, Sweden 5 points, Belgium 3.
Group C:
 54–72 
 52–59 
Final standings: Italy 6 points, Lithuania 5, Poland 4, Latvia 3.
Group D:
 73–74 
 84–74 
Final standings: France 6 points, Ukraine 5, Turkey 4, Czech Republic 3.

Cricket
Pakistan in England:
1st Test in Nottingham, day 3:
 354 and 262/9d (75.3 overs; Matt Prior 102*);  182 (54 overs; James Anderson 5-54) and 15/3 (7 overs). Pakistan require another 420 runs with 7 wickets remaining.

Cycling
UCI ProTour:
Clásica de San Sebastián:  Luis León Sánchez  5h 47' 13"  Alexander Vinokourov  s.t.  Carlos Sastre  s.t.
UCI World Rankings (after 18 of 26 events): (1) Alberto Contador  482 points (2) Joaquim Rodríguez  428 (3) Cadel Evans  390

Extreme sport
X Games XVI in Los Angeles: (USA unless stated)
BMX Freestyle Park:  Daniel Dhers   Dennis Enarson  Gary Young
Men's Skateboard Street:  Ryan Sheckler  Nyjah Huston  Ryan Decenzo
BMX Freestyle Big Air:  Chad Kagy  Steve McCann   Andy Buckworth 
Rally Car Racing:  Tanner Foust  Brian Deegan  Antoine L'Estage  and Andrew Comrie-Picard 
Rally Car SuperRally:  Foust  Deegan  Samuel Hübinette 
Skateboard Big Air Rail Jam:  Bob Burnquist   Rob Lorifice  Elliot Sloan

Field hockey
Men's Hockey Champions Trophy in Mönchengladbach, Germany:
 4–2 
 9–1 
 5–2

Football (soccer)
CAF Champions League group stage, matchday 2:
Group A: Espérance ST  1–0  Dynamos
Standings:  Espérance ST 6 points (2 matches),  TP Mazembe 3 (1),  ES Sétif 0 (1), Dynamos 0 (2).
Group B: JS Kabylie  1–0  Heartland
Standings: JS Kabylie 6 points (2 matches),  Al-Ahly 1 (1), Heartland 1 (2),  Ismaily 0 (1).
CAF Confederation Cup Play-off for group stage, second leg: (first leg score in parentheses)
ASFAN  2–1 (2–2)  Al-Merreikh. ASFAN win 4–3 on aggregate.
Primeiro de Agosto  2–1 (0–2)  Ittihad. Ittihad win 3–2 on aggregate.
Haras El Hodood  8–1 (0–1)  Gaborone United. Haras El Hodood win 8–2 on aggregate.
CR Belouizdad  1–1 (0–0)  Djoliba. 1–1 on aggregate; Djoliba win on away goals rule.

Golf
Women's majors:
Ricoh Women's British Open in Southport, England:
Leaderboard after third round: (1) Yani Tseng  204 (–12) (2) Katherine Hull  208 (3) In-Kyung Kim  210
Senior majors:
U.S. Senior Open in Sammamish, Washington, USA:
Leaderboard after third round: (T1) Fred Couples  & Bernhard Langer  205 (–5) (T3) Tom Kite  & Lu Chien-Soon  210

Rugby union
Tri Nations Series:
 28–49  in Melbourne
Standings: New Zealand 15 points (3 matches), Australia 4 (2),  0 (3).

Shooting
ISSF World Championships in Munich, Germany:
10m Air Rifle Men:  Nicolo Campriani  702.5 points  Péter Sidi  700.4  Gagan Narang  699
10m Air Rifle Men Team:   1787 points   1787   1782
10m Air Rifle Men Junior:  Sergiy Kasper  595 points  Serhiy Kulish  594  Alexander Dryagin  593
10m Air Rifle Men Junior Team:   1774 points   1772   1771
Trap Women:  Zuzana Štefečeková  91 points  Liu Yingzi  89  Jessica Rossi  87+3
Trap Women Team:   211 points   209   207
Trap Women Junior:  Miranda Wilder  69 points+10  Catherine Skinner  69+9  Rachael Lynn Heiden  68+1
Trap Women Junior Team:   202 points   194   194
50m Pistol Men Team:   1686 points   1681   1680

Water polo
FINA Men's World Cup in Oradea, Romania:
5th–8th Semifinals:
 10–6 
 24–6 
Semifinals:
 9–11 
 12–10

July 30, 2010 (Friday)

Athletics
European Championships in Barcelona, Spain:
Men:
200m:  Christophe Lemaitre  20.37  Christian Malcolm  20.38  Martial Mbandjock  20.42
400m:  Kevin Borlée  45.08  Michael Bingham  45.23  Martyn Rooney  45.23
1500m:  Arturo Casado  3:42.74  Carsten Schlangen  3:43.52  Manuel Olmedo  3:43.54
110m hurdles:  Andy Turner  13.28  Garfield Darien  13.34  Dániel Kiss  13.39
50km walk:  Yohann Diniz  3:40:37  Grzegorz Sudoł  3:42:24  Sergey Bakulin  3:43:26
Women:
400m:  Tatyana Firova  49.89  Kseniya Ustalova  49.92  Antonina Krivoshapka  50.10
800m:  Mariya Savinova  1:58.22  Yvonne Hak  1:58.85  Jenny Meadows  1:59.39
400m hurdles:  Natalya Antyukh  52.92  Vania Stambolova  53.82  Perri Shakes-Drayton  54.18
3000m steeplechase:  Yuliya Zarudneva  9:17.57  Marta Domínguez  9:17.74  Lyubov Kharlamova  9:29.82
Hammer throw:  Betty Heidler  76.38 m  Tatyana Lysenko  75.65 m  Anita Włodarczyk  73.56 m
Pole vault:  Svetlana Feofanova  4.75 m  Silke Spiegelburg  4.65 m  Lisa Ryzih  4.65 m
African Championships in Nairobi, Kenya:
Men:
400m:  Mohamed Khouaja  44.98  Rabah Yousif  45.18  Gary Kikaya  45.28
800m:  David Rudisha  1:42.84  Alfred Kirwa Yego  1:44.85  Jackson Kivuva  1:45.47
400m hurdles:  L. J. van Zyl  48.51  Cornel Fredericks  48.79  Mamadou Kassé Hanne  49.10
3000m steeplechase:  Richard Mateelong  8:23.54  Ezekiel Kemboi  8:26.13  Roba Gary Chubeta  8:27.15
Women:
400m:  Amantle Montsho  50.03  Amy Mbacké Thiam  51.32  Shade Abugan  51.63
Discus throw:  Elizna Naudé  56.74 m  Kazai Suzanne Kragbe  55.53 m  Sarah Hasseib Dardiri  46.51 m
High jump:  Selloane Tsoaeli  1.75 m  Lissa Labiche  1.70 m  Cherotich Koech  1.55 m
Long jump:  Blessing Okagbare  6.62 m  Comfort Onyali  6.42 m  Jamaa Chnaik  6.30 m

Baseball
European Championship in Germany:
Pool C: (teams in bold advance to the final)
 3–2 
 9–2 
 0–10 
 15–0 
 8–6 
Standings: Netherlands 4–0, Italy 3–1, Germany, Sweden 2–2, Greece 1–3, France 0–4.
7th place game:  8–4

Basketball
South American Championship in Neiva, Colombia:
5th–8th semifinals:
 45–89 
 78–71 
Semifinals:
 73–79 
 79–67 
FIBA Europe Under-18 Championship in Lithuania:
Quarterfinals:
 73–68 
 78–56 
 84–51 
 75–57 
9th–12th semifinals:
 60–66 
 91–96 
Group G:
 59–74 
 73–70 
Standings (after 4 games): Germany 7 points, Sweden, Ukraine 6, Bulgaria 5.
FIBA Europe Under-18 Championship for Women in Slovakia: (teams in bold advance to Qualifying Round)
Group A:
 67–52 
 40–72 
Standings (after 2 games): Spain 4 points, Slovak Republic, Serbia 3, Hungary 2.
Group B:
 70–57 
 45–56 
Standings (after 2 games): Sweden 4 points, Slovenia, Russia 3, Belgium 2.
Group C:
 51–79 
 50–70 
Standings (after 2 games): Lithuania, Italy 4 points, Poland, Latvia 2.
Group D:
 76–75 
 55–57 
Standings (after 2 games): France 4 points, Turkey, Ukraine 3, Czech Republic 2.

Cricket
Pakistan in England:
1st Test in Nottingham, day 2:
 354 (104.1 overs; Eoin Morgan 130);  147/9 (50 overs). Pakistan trail by 207 runs with 1 wicket remaining in the 1st innings.
India in Sri Lanka:
2nd Test in Colombo, day 5:
 642/4d (159.4 overs) and 129/3d (45 overs);  707 (225.2 overs). Match drawn; Sri Lanka lead 3-match series 1–0.

Cycling
UCI Women's Road World Cup:
Open de Suède Vårgårda, Team Time Trial:  |  Charlotte Becker Regina Bruins Iris Slappendel Kirsten Wild    Judith Arndt Ellen van Dijk Adrie Visser Linda Villumsen   Liesbet De Vocht Loes Gunnewijk Annemiek van Vleuten Marianne Vos

Equestrianism
Show jumping:
Meydan FEI Nations Cup:
7th competition: FEI Nations Cup of Great Britain in Hickstead (CSIO 5*):   (Peter Charles on Murkas Pom D'Ami, William Funnell on Billy Congo, Tina Fletcher on Hallo Sailor, Michael Whitaker on GIG Amai)   (Daniel Deußer on Cabreado S.E., Jörg Naeve on Calado, Philipp Weishaupt on Catoki, Lars Nieberg on Lord Luis)   (Cara Raether on Ublesco, Robert Kraut on Graf Lando, McLain Ward on Rothchild, Rich Fellers on Flexible)
Standings (after 7 of 8 competitions): (1)  48.5 points (2) Great Britain 38.5 (3) United States 37.5

Extreme sport
X Games XVI in Los Angeles: (USA unless stated)
Women's Skateboard Vert:  Gaby Ponce  Lyn-Z Adams Hawkins  Karen Jonz 
BMX Freestyle Vert:  Jamie Bestwick  Steve McCann  Simon Tabron 
Moto X Step Up:  Matt Buyten  Ronnie Renner  Todd Potter
Skateboard Vert:  Pierre-Luc Gagnon   Shaun White  Andy Macdonald
Moto X Best Whip:  Potter  Jarryd McNeil  Jeremy Stenberg
Moto X Best Trick:  Cam Sinclair   Robbie Maddison   Taka Higashino 
Skateboard Amateurs Vert:  Italo Penarrubia   Sam Bosworth   Jono Schwan
Skateboard Vert Best Trick:  Gagnon  Colin McKay   Bob Burnquist

Football (soccer)
UEFA European Under-19 Championship in France:
Final:  1–2 
France win the under-19 tournament for the second time, and their seventh youth title overall.

Golf
Women's majors:
Ricoh Women's British Open in Southport, England:
Leaderboard after second round: (1) Yani Tseng  136 (−8) (T2) Cristie Kerr , Brittany Lincicome  & Amy Yang  140
Senior majors:
U.S. Senior Open in Sammamish, Washington, USA:
Leaderboard after second round (USA unless indicated): (1) Bernhard Langer  137 (–3) (T2) Tommy Armour III, John Cook & J. R. Roth 139

Water polo
FINA Men's World Cup in Oradea, Romania:
Quarterfinals:
 12–14 
 9–12 
 11–5 
 2–23

July 29, 2010 (Thursday)

Athletics
European Championships in Barcelona, Spain:
Men:
High jump:  Aleksandr Shustov  2.33 m  Ivan Ukhov  2.31 m  Martyn Bernard  2.29 m
Triple jump:  Phillips Idowu  17.81 m  Marian Oprea  17.51 m  Teddy Tamgho  17.45 m
Decathlon:  Romain Barras  8453 points  Eelco Sintnicolaas  8436  Andrei Krauchanka  8370
Women:
100m:  Verena Sailer  11.10  Véronique Mang  11.11  Myriam Soumaré  11.18
Javelin throw:  Linda Stahl  66.81 m  Christina Obergföll  65.58 m  Barbora Špotáková  65.36 m
African Championships in Nairobi, Kenya:
Men:
100m:  Ben Youssef Meite  10.08  Aziz Zakari  10.12  Simon Magakwe  10.14
Discus throw:  Omar Ahmed El Ghazaly  59.30 m  Yasser Ibrahim Farag  58.71 m  Victor Hogan  58.11 m
Long jump:  Godfrey Khotso Mokoena  8.23 m  Ndiss Kaba Badji  8.10 m  Stanley Gbagbeke  8.06 m
Decathlon:  Larbi Bourrada  8148 points  Mourad Souissi  7818  Guillaume Thierry  7100
Women:
100m:  Blessing Okagbare  11.03  Ruddy Zang Milama  11.15  Oludamola Osayomi  11.22
5000m:  Vivian Cheruiyot  16:18.72  Meseret Defar  16:20.54  Sentayehu Ejigu  16:22.32
100m hurdles:  Seun Adigun  13.14  Gnima Faye  13.67  Amina Ferguen  13.87
Pole vault:  Nisrine Dinar  3.70 m  Laetitia Berthier  3.50 m  Sinali Alima Outtara  3.40 m

Baseball
European Championship in Germany: (teams in bold advance to the semifinals)
Pool B:  3–2 
Final standings: Italy 4–1, Sweden,  3–2,  2–3,  1–4.
Pool C:  17–8 
Standings:  2–0, Germany 2–1,  1–1, Greece 1–2,  0–2.

Cricket
Pakistan in England:
1st Test in Nottingham, day 1:
 331/4 (90 overs; Eoin Morgan 125*); .
India in Sri Lanka:
2nd Test in Colombo, day 4:
 642/4d (159.4 overs);  669/9 (198 overs; Sachin Tendulkar 203, Suresh Raina 120). India lead by 27 runs with 1 wicket remaining in the 1st innings.

Extreme sport
X Games XVI in Los Angeles: (USA unless stated)
Moto X Super X Adaptive:  Mike Schultz  Todd Thompson  Beau Meier
Men's Moto X Super X:  Josh Grant  Justin Brayton  Josh Hansen
Women's Moto X Super X:  Ashley Fiolek  Tarah Gieger   Sara Price
Moto X Freestyle:  Travis Pastrana  Levi Sherwood   Nate Adams
Skateboard Big Air:  Jake Brown   Bob Burnquist   Rob Lorifice

Football (soccer)
2011 FIFA Women's World Cup qualification (UEFA): (team in bold advances to the playoff round, teams in strike are eliminated)
Group 5:  3–0 
Standings: England 19 points (7 matches),  19 (8),  9 (6), Turkey 6 (7),  0 (8).
FIFA U-20 Women's World Cup in Germany:
Semifinals:
 5–1 
 0–1 
UEFA Europa League Third qualifying round, first leg:
Sibir Novosibirsk  1–0  Apollon
Spartak Zlatibor Voda  2–1  Dnipro Dnipropetrovsk
Beroe Stara Zagora  1–1  Rapid Wien
Dnepr Mogilev  1–0  Baník Ostrava
MYPA  1–2  Timişoara
Inter Turku  1–5  Genk
Ruch Chorzów  1–3  Austria Wien
Karpaty Lviv  1–0  Zestafoni
Molde  2–3  Stuttgart
IF Elfsborg  5–0  Teteks
Utrecht  1–0  Luzern
Randers  2–3  Lausanne-Sport
Aalesunds  1–1  Motherwell
APOEL  1–0  Jablonec
Odense  5–3  Zrinjski
Kalmar FF  1–1  Levski Sofia
Maccabi Haifa  1–0  Dinamo Minsk
Wisła Kraków  0–1  Qarabağ
Cercle Brugge  1–0  Anorthosis
Dinamo București  3–1  Hajduk Split
Galatasaray  2–2  OFK Beograd
Nordsjælland  0–1  Sporting CP
Maribor  3–0  Hibernian
Red Star Belgrade  1–2  Slovan Bratislava
Viktoria Plzeň  1–1  Beşiktaş
Olympiacos  2–1  Maccabi Tel Aviv
Sturm Graz  2–0  Dinamo Tbilisi
Győri ETO  0–1  Montpellier
Marítimo  8–2  Bangor City
Shamrock Rovers  0–2  Juventus
AZ  2–0  IFK Göteborg
Jagiellonia Białystok  1–2  Aris
Rabotnički  0–2  Liverpool
Budućnost Podgorica  1–2  Brøndby
CONCACAF Champions League Preliminary Round, first leg:
FAS  1–1  Xelajú

Golf
Women's majors:
Ricoh Women's British Open in Southport, England:
Leaderboard after first round: (T1) Katherine Hull  & Yani Tseng  68 (−4) (T3) Anne-Lise Caudal , Brittany Lincicome , Amy Yang  & Sun Young Yoo  69
Senior majors:
U.S. Senior Open in Sammamish, Washington, USA:
Leaderboard after first round (all USA): (T1) Bruce Vaughan 66 (–4) (2) Tim Jackson (a) & Loren Roberts 68

Volleyball
Central American and Caribbean Games in Mayagüez, Puerto Rico:
Bronze medal match:   3–2 
Final:   2–3

Water polo
FINA Men's World Cup in Oradea, Romania:
Group A:
 8–14 
 4–26 
Final standings: Spain 6 points, Romania 4, Australia 2, Iran 0.
Group B:
 8–15 
 7–9 
Final standings: Croatia 6 points, Serbia 4, United States 2, China 0.

July 28, 2010 (Wednesday)

Athletics
European Championships in Barcelona, Spain:
Men:
Hammer throw:  Libor Charfreitag  80.02 m  Nicola Vizzoni  79.12 m  Krisztián Pars  79.06 m
100m:  Christophe Lemaitre  10.11  Mark Lewis-Francis  10.18  Martial Mbandjock  10.18
Women:
20km walk:  Olga Kaniskina  1:27:44  Anisya Kirdyapkina  1:28:55  Vera Sokolova  1:29:32
Discus throw:  Sandra Perković  64.67 m  Nicoleta Grasu  63.48 m  Joanna Wiśniewska  62.37 m
Long jump:  Ineta Radēviča  6.92 m  Naide Gomes  6.92 m  Olga Kucherenko  6.84 m
10,000m:  Elvan Abeylegesse  31:10.23  Inga Abitova  31:22.83  Jéssica Augusto  31:25.77
African Championships in Nairobi, Kenya:
Men:
10,000m:  Wilson Kiprop  27:32.91  Moses Ndiema Kipsiro  27:33.37  Geoffrey Mutai  27:33.83
Shot put:  Burger Lambrechts  18.63 m  Roelof Potgieter  18.62 m  Orazio Cremona  18.27 m
Women:
Hammer throw:  Amy Sène  64.11 m  Marwa Hussein  62.36 m  Florence Ezeh  57.94 m

Baseball
European Championship in Germany: (teams in bold advance to the semifinals)
Pool A:  3–0 
Final standings: Netherlands 5–0, Germany 4–1,  3–2,  2–3,  1–4,  0–5.
Pool B:  13–1 
Standings:  4–0, Greece 3–2,  2–2,  2–3, Croatia 1–4.
11th place game:  vs. . Cancelled due to inclement weather, both teams share 11th place.
Men's Central American and Caribbean Games in Mayagüez, Puerto Rico:
Bronze medal game:   7–6 
Final:   3–2

Basketball
FIBA Europe Under-18 Championship in Lithuania: (teams in bold advance to the quarterfinals)
Group E:
 73–69 
 75–78 
 65–69 
Final standings: Lithuania 10 points, Latvia 8, Poland, France, Spain 7, Slovenia 6.
Group F:
 82–77 
 97–52 
 69–52 
Final standings: Russia 9 points, Serbia, Croatia, Greece 8, Italy, Turkey 6.
Group G:
 76–81 
 58–65 
Standings (after 3 games): Germany 6 points, Sweden 5, Ukraine 4, Bulgaria 3.
South American Championship in Neiva, Colombia: (teams in bold advance to the semifinals)
Group A:
 93–81 
 64–75 
Final standings: Brazil 6 points, Uruguay 5, Paraguay 4, Chile 3.
Group B:
 104–43 
 63–70 
Final standings: Argentina, Venezuela, Colombia 5 points, Ecuador 3.

Cricket
India in Sri Lanka:
2nd Test in Colombo, day 3:
 642/4d (159.4 overs);  382/4 (108 overs; Sachin Tendulkar 108*). India trail by 260 runs with 6 wickets remaining in the 1st innings.
ICC Intercontinental Cup in Amstelveen, day 4:
 XI 298 (89 overs) and 305/5d (70.3 overs);  186 (75.5 overs) and 280 (94 overs). Zimbabwe XI win by 137 runs.
Standings:  69 points (4 matches),  57 (4), Zimbabwe XI 43 (3),  43 (5), Netherlands 15 (5),  12 (3),  9 (4).

Football (soccer)
UEFA Champions League Third qualifying round, first leg:
Aktobe  1–0  Hapoel Tel Aviv
BATE  0–0  Copenhagen
Sheriff Tiraspol  1–1  Dinamo Zagreb
Debrecen  0–2  Basel
Young Boys  2–2  Fenerbahçe
AIK  0–1  Rosenborg
Partizan  3–0  HJK Helsinki
Ajax  1–1  PAOK
Braga  3–0  Celtic
Copa Libertadores Semifinals, first leg:
Internacional  1–0  São Paulo
CONCACAF Champions League Preliminary Round, first leg:
Tauro  0–3  Marathón
Brujas  2–2  Joe Public
Seattle Sounders FC  1–0  Isidro Metapán
/ 2010 MLS All-Star Game in Houston:
 Manchester United 5, MLS All-Stars 2
Federico Macheda, who goes on to earn MVP honors, opens United's scoring 24 seconds in and adds a second early goal as United coast to a lopsided win.
 Copa do Brasil Final, first leg:
Santos 2–0 Vitória

Volleyball
Central American and Caribbean Games in Mayagüez, Puerto Rico:
Classification 5/6:  2–3 
Semifinals:
 3–0 
 3–1

Water polo
FINA Men's World Cup in Oradea, Romania:
Group A:
 9–11 
 1–26 
Standings (after 2 matches): Romania, Spain 4 points, Australia, Iran 0.
Group B:
 14–4 
 9–17 
Standings (after 2 matches): Croatia 4 points, Serbia, United States 2, China 0.

July 27, 2010 (Tuesday)

Athletics
European Championships in Barcelona, Spain:
Men:
10,000m:  Mohammed Farah  28:24.99  Chris Thompson  28:27.33  Daniele Meucci  28:27.33
20km walk:  Stanislav Emelyanov  1:20:10  Alex Schwazer  1:20:38  João Vieira  1:20:49
Women:
Shot put:  Nadzeya Astapchuk  20.48 m  Natallia Mikhnevich  19.53 m  Anna Avdeyeva  19.39 m

Baseball
European Championship in Germany: (teams in bold advance to the semifinals)
Pool A:
 8–2 
 1–11 
 0–10 
 10–9 
Standings: Netherlands, Germany 4–0, France 3–2, Czech Republic 2–3, Belgium 1–4, Ukraine 0–5.
Pool B:
 16–6 
 4–3 
 13–1 
Standings: Italy 4–0, Greece 3–1, Sweden 2–2, Great Britain, Spain 2–3, Croatia 0–4.
Men's Central American and Caribbean Games in Mayagüez, Puerto Rico:
Semifinals:
 6–5 
 0–1

Basketball
FIBA Europe Under-18 Championship in Lithuania: (teams in bold advance to the quarterfinals)
Group E:
 75–51 
 77–58 
 59–63 
Standings (after 4 games): Lithuania 8 points, Latvia 7, Poland 6, France, Spain, Slovenia 5.
Group F:
 61–72 
 79–65 
 75–61 
Standings (after 4 games): Russia, Greece 7 points, Serbia, Croatia 6, Italy, Turkey 5.
Group G:
 75–79 
 73–66 
Standings (after 2 games): Germany 4 points, Sweden, Ukraine 3, Bulgaria 2.
South American Championship in Neiva, Colombia:
Group A:
 72–76 
 89–63 
Group B:
 107–43 
 84–83 (OT)

Cricket
India in Sri Lanka:
2nd Test in Colombo, day 2:
 642/4d (159.4 overs; Kumar Sangakkara 219, Mahela Jayawardene 174);  95/0 (18 overs). India trail by 547 runs with 10 wickets remaining in the 1st innings.
ICC Intercontinental Cup in Amstelveen, day 3:
 XI 298 (89 overs) and 305/5d (70.3 overs);  186 (75.5 overs) and 134/4 (37.4 overs). Netherlands require another 284 runs with 6 wickets remaining.

Football (soccer)
UEFA European Under-19 Championship in France:
Semi-finals:
 3–1 
 2–1 
UEFA Champions League Third qualifying round, first leg:
Omonia  1–1  Red Bull Salzburg
Litex Lovech  1–1  Žilina
Dynamo Kyiv  3–0  Gent
Unirea Urziceni  0–0  Zenit St. Petersburg
Sparta Prague  1–0  Lech Poznań
The New Saints  1–3  Anderlecht
UEFA Europa League Third qualifying round, first leg:
CSKA Sofia  3–0  Cliftonville
Copa Libertadores Semifinals, first leg:
Guadalajara  1–1  Universidad de Chile
CONCACAF Champions League Preliminary Round, first leg:
Toronto FC  1–0  Motagua
San Juan Jabloteh  0–1  Santos Laguna
Los Angeles Galaxy  1–4  Puerto Rico Islanders
San Francisco  2–3  Cruz Azul

Volleyball
Central American and Caribbean Games in Mayagüez, Puerto Rico:
Quarterfinals:
 3–1 
 3–0

Water polo
FINA Men's World Cup in Oradea, Romania:
Group A:
 1–26 
 7–9 
Group B:
 10–6 
 10–8

July 26, 2010 (Monday)

Baseball
Major League Baseball:
Facing the minimum 27 batters but surrendering just one walk, Matt Garza of the Tampa Bay Rays hurls the franchise's first – and the 2010 MLB season's fifth – no-hitter as the Rays defeat the Detroit Tigers, 5–0.
European Championship in Germany:
Pool A:
 1–7 
 10–1 
 10–2 
 –  postponed
Standings: Germany, Netherlands 3–0, France 2–1, Belgium 1–2, Czech Republic 1–3, Ukraine 0–4.
Pool B:
 5–1 
 –  postponed
 –  postponed
Standings: Italy 3–0, Sweden, Greece 2–1, Great Britain 2–2, Spain 1–3, Croatia 0–3.
Men's Central American and Caribbean Games in Mayagüez, Puerto Rico:
Playoffs:
 2–0 
 0–7

Basketball
FIBA Europe Under-18 Championship in Lithuania: (teams in bold advance to the quarterfinals)
Group E:
 76–74 
 63–104 
 67–81 
Standings (after 3 games): Lithuania 6 points, Latvia, Poland 5, Spain, Slovenia 4, France 3.
Group F:
 97–88 
 55–78 
 49–63 
Standings (after 3 games): Serbia, Russia, Greece 5 points, Italy, Croatia, Turkey 4.
Group G:
 59–73 
 88–66 
South American Championship in Neiva, Colombia:
Group A:
 66–61 
 69–54 
Group B:
 75–72 
 94–46

Cricket
India in Sri Lanka:
2nd Test in Colombo, day 1:
 312/2 (90 overs; Kumar Sangakkara 130*, Tharanga Paranavitana 100); .
ICC Intercontinental Cup in Amstelveen, day 2:
 XI 298 (89 overs) and 79/2 (23 overs);  186 (75.5 overs). Zimbabwe XI lead by 191 runs with 8 wickets remaining.

Volleyball
Central American and Caribbean Games in Mayagüez, Puerto Rico:
Group A:  0–3 
Final standings: Venezuela 4 points, Dominican Republic 3,  2.
Group B:
 0–3 
 3–1 
Final standings: Puerto Rico 6 points, Mexico 5, Trinidad and Tobago 4, Barbados 3.

July 25, 2010 (Sunday)

Athletics
World Junior Championships in Moncton, Canada:
Men:
800m:  David Mutinda Mutua  1:46.41  Casimir Loxsom  1:46.57  Robby Andrews  1:47.00
110m hurdles:  Pascal Martinot-Lagarde  13.52  Vladimir Vukicevic  13.59  Jack Meredith  13.59
3000m steeplechase:  Jonathan Muia Ndiku  8:23.48  Albert Kiptoo Yator  8:33.55  Jacob Araptany  8:37.02
4 × 400 m relay:   3:04.76   3:06.36    3:06.49
Hammer throw:  Conor McCullough  80.79 m  Ákos Hudi  78.37 m  Alaa El-Din El-Ashry  76.66 m
Triple jump:  Aleksey Fyodorov  16.68 m  Ernesto Revé  16.47 m  Omar Craddock  16.23 m
Women:
1500m:  Tizita Bogale  4:08.06  Ciara Mageean  4:09.51  Nancy Chepkwemoi  4:11.04
4 × 400 m relay:   3:31.20   3:31.84   3:32.24
High jump:  Marija Vukovic  1.91 m  Airinė Palšytė  1.89 m  Elena Vallortigara  1.89 m

Auto racing
Formula One:
German Grand Prix in Hockenheim, Germany: (1) Fernando Alonso  (Ferrari) (2) Felipe Massa  (Ferrari) (3) Sebastian Vettel  (Red Bull–Renault)
Drivers' championship standings (after 11 of 19 races): (1) Lewis Hamilton  (McLaren–Mercedes) 157 points (2) Jenson Button  (McLaren-Mercedes) 143 (3) Mark Webber  (Red Bull-Renault) and Vettel 136
Constructors' championship standings: (1) McLaren 300 points (2) Red Bull 272 (3) Ferrari 208
After the race, Ferrari receive a US$100,000 fine for breaching sporting regulations, by apparently implementing team orders in relation to Alonso passing Massa for the lead on lap 49. (BBC)
NASCAR Sprint Cup Series:
Brickyard 400 in Speedway, Indiana: (1)  Jamie McMurray (Chevrolet; Earnhardt Ganassi Racing) (2)  Kevin Harvick (Chevrolet; Richard Childress Racing) (3)  Greg Biffle (Ford; Roush Fenway Racing)
Drivers' championship standings (after 20 of 36 races): (1) Harvick 2920 points (2)  Jeff Gordon (Chevrolet; Hendrick Motorsports) 2736 (3)  Denny Hamlin (Toyota; Joe Gibbs Racing) 2660
McMurray becomes the third driver to win the Daytona 500 and the Brickyard 400 in the same season after Dale Jarrett in 1996 and Jimmie Johnson in 2006.
McMurray's team owner Chip Ganassi completes a treble of winning the Daytona 500, the Brickyard 400 and the Indianapolis 500 in the same season.
IndyCar Series:
Honda Indy Edmonton in Edmonton, Canada: (1) Scott Dixon  (Chip Ganassi Racing) (2) Will Power  (Team Penske) (3) Dario Franchitti  (Chip Ganassi Racing)
Drivers' championship standings (after 11 of 17 races): (1) Power 420 points (2) Franchitti 370 (3) Dixon 349

Baseball
European Championship in Germany:
Pool A:
 12–2 
 8–4 
 6–1 
Standings: Germany 3–0, Netherlands 2–0, Belgium, France 1–1, Czech Republic, Ukraine 0–3.
Pool B:
 2–12 
 12–2 
 9–13 
Standings: Italy 3–0, Sweden, Greece 2–1, Spain 1–2, Great Britain 1–2, Croatia 0–3.
Men's Central American and Caribbean Games in Mayagüez, Puerto Rico: (teams in bold advance to the playoffs)
Pool A:  0–6 
Final standings: Puerto Rico 4–0,  3–1,  2–2,  1–3, U.S. Virgin Islands 0–4.
Pool B:
 3–2 
 1–2 
Final standings: Dominican Republic, Mexico,  2–1, Netherlands Antilles 0–3.

Basketball
FIBA Under-17 World Championship for Women in Rodez and Toulouse, France:
7th place playoff:  48–74 
5th place playoff:  68–74 
Bronze medal game:   85–73 
Final:   92–62  
The USA win the inaugural edition of the event.
FIBA Europe Under-20 Championship for Women in Latvia:
Group G:
 80–51 
 68–75 
Final standings: Romania 11 points, Germany 10, Sweden 9, Bulgaria 6.
Sweden and Bulgaria are relegated to Division B.
7th place playoff:  46–68 
5th place playoff:  64–82 
Bronze medal game:  49–53  
Final:   75–74  
Russia win the title for the fifth time.

Cricket
ICC Intercontinental Cup in Amstelveen, day 1:
 XI 298 (89 overs; Craig Ervine 145);  7/2 (5 overs). Netherlands trail by 291 runs with 8 wickets remaining in the 1st innings.

Cycling
Grand Tours:
Tour de France:
Stage 20:  Mark Cavendish  2h 42' 21"  Alessandro Petacchi   s.t.  Julian Dean  s.t.
Cavendish wins the last stage of the Tour on the Champs-Élysées for the second straight year, the first ever rider to do so.
Final general classification: (1) Alberto Contador   91h 58' 48" (2) Andy Schleck   + 39" (3) Denis Menchov  + 2' 01"
Contador wins the Tour for the third time in four years, and his fifth Grand Tour title.

Darts
PDC Major:
World Matchplay, day 9:
Final: Phil Taylor  def. Raymond van Barneveld  18–12
Taylor wins his eleventh World Matchplay title and the 58th major title of his PDC career.

Equestrianism
Show jumping:
FEI World Cup Jumping – North American League, East Coast:
2nd Competition in Bromont, Quebec (CSI**-W):  Yann Candele  on Game Ready  Ljubov Kochetova  on Aslan  Jenna Thompson  on Zeke
Standings (after 1 of 17 competitions): (1) Pablo Barrios  30 points (2) Eric Lamaze  24 (3) Candele 21

Football (soccer)
FIFA U-20 Women's World Cup in Germany:
Quarterfinals:
 1–1 (2–4 pen.) 
 1–3

Golf
Senior majors:
Senior British Open in Carnoustie, Scotland: (USA unless indicated)
(1) Bernhard Langer  279 (−5) (2) Corey Pavin 280 (−4) (3) Jay Don Blake, Russ Cochran, Fred Funk & Peter Senior  283 (−1)
Langer wins his first senior major, third Champions Tour title of the season, and eleventh of his career.
PGA Tour:
RBC Canadian Open in Oakville, Ontario:
Winner: Carl Pettersson  266 (−14)
Pettersson wins his fourth PGA Tour title.
European Tour:
Nordea Scandinavian Masters in Stockholm, Sweden:
Winner: Richard S. Johnson  277 (−11)
Johnson wins his second European Tour title.
LPGA Tour:
Evian Masters in Évian-les-Bains, France:
Winner: Jiyai Shin  274 (−14)
Shin wins her seventh LPGA Tour title and regains the #1 spot in the Women's World Golf Rankings.

Horse racing
Canadian Triple Crown:
Prince of Wales Stakes in Fort Erie, Ontario:
 (1) Golden Moka (jockey: Anthony Stephen; trainer: Brian Lynch) (2) Mobil Unit (jockey: David Clark; trainer: Mike Keogh) (3) Big Red Mike (jockey: Eurico Rosa da Silva; trainer: Nick Gonzalez)

Motorcycle racing
Moto GP:
United States motorcycle Grand Prix in Monterey, United States: (1) Jorge Lorenzo  (Yamaha) (2) Casey Stoner  (Ducati) (3) Valentino Rossi  (Yamaha)
Riders' championship standings (after 9 of 18 rounds): (1) Lorenzo 210 points (2) Dani Pedrosa  (Honda) 138 (3) Andrea Dovizioso  (Honda) 115
Manufacturers' championship standings: (1) Yamaha 215 points (2) Honda 175 (3) Ducati 133

Snooker
Irish Classic in Dublin:
Final: Fergal O'Brien  def. Michael Judge  5–1
O'Brien wins his second professional title.

Tennis
ATP World Tour:
International German Open in Hamburg, Germany:
Final: Andrey Golubev  def. Jürgen Melzer  6–3, 7–5
Golubev becomes the first Kazakhstani player to win an ATP Tour title.
Atlanta Tennis Championships in Johns Creek, Georgia, United States:
Final: Mardy Fish  def. John Isner  4–6, 6–4, 7–6(4)
Fish wins the fifth title of his career.
WTA Tour:
Banka Koper Slovenia Open in Portorož, Slovenia:
Final: Anna Chakvetadze  def. Johanna Larsson  6–1, 6–2
Chakvetadze wins the eighth title of her career.
Gastein Ladies in Bad Gastein, Austria:
Final: Julia Görges  def. Timea Bacsinszky  6–1, 6–4
Görges wins the first title of her career.

Volleyball
FIVB World League Final Round in Córdoba, Argentina:
3rd place:   3–2 
Final:   1–3  
Brazil win the title for the ninth time.
Women's European League Final Four in Ankara, Turkey:
Bronze medal match:  0–3  
Final:   3–1  
Serbia win the title for the second consecutive time, and qualify for 2011 FIVB World Grand Prix.
Central American and Caribbean Games in Mayagüez, Puerto Rico:
Group A:  1–3 
Standings: , Dominican Republic 2 points (1 match), Panama 2 (2).
Group B:
 0–3 
 0–3 
Standings (after 2 matches): Puerto Rico, Mexico 4 points, Barbados, Trinidad and Tobago 2.

July 24, 2010 (Saturday)

Athletics
World Junior Championships in Moncton, Canada:
Men:
5000m:  David Kiprotich Bett  13:23.76  John Kipkoech  13:26.03  Aziz Lahbabi  13:28.92
4 × 100 m relay:   38.93   39.55   39.72
Discus throw:  Andrius Gudžius  63.78 m  Andrei Gag  61.85 m  Julian Wruck  61.09 m
Women:
400m hurdles:  Katsiaryna Artsiukh  56.16  Vera Rudakova  57.16  Evonne Britton  57.32
4 × 100 m relay:   43.44   43.74   44.09
Hammer throw:  Sophie Hitchon  66.01 m  Barbara Špiler  65.28 m  Li Zhang  63.96 m
Pole vault:  Angelica Bengtsson  4.25 m  Victoria von Eynatten  4.20 m  Holly Bleasdale  4.15 m

Auto racing
Nationwide Series:
Kroger 200 in Clermont, Indiana: (1)  Kyle Busch (Toyota; Joe Gibbs Racing) (2)  Carl Edwards (Ford; Roush Fenway Racing) (3)  Aric Almirola (Chevrolet; JR Motorsports)
Drivers' championship standings (after 20 of 35 races): (1)  Brad Keselowski (Dodge; Penske Racing) 3189 points (2) Edwards 2989 (3)  Justin Allgaier (Dodge; Penske Racing) 2691

Baseball
European Championship in Germany:
Pool A:
 9–0 
 10–0 
 6–2 
Standings: Germany 2–0, Netherlands, Belgium 1–0, Czech Republic, France 0–1, Ukraine 0–2.
Pool B:
 7–6 
 1–4 
 1–13 
Standings: Italy 2–0, Greece, Sweden, Spain, Great Britain 1–1, Croatia 0–2.
Men's Central American and Caribbean Games in Mayagüez, Puerto Rico:
Pool A:
 2–1 
 15–0 
 11–0 
Standings: Puerto Rico 3–0, Venezuela 3–1, Panama 2–2, Guatemala 1–3, U.S. Virgin Islands 0–3.
Pool B:
 2–5 
 8–2 
Standings: Dominican Republic 2–0, Nicaragua 2–1, Mexico 0–1, Netherlands Antilles 0–2.

Basketball
FIBA Under-17 World Championship for Women in Rodez and Toulouse, France:
Semifinals:
 74–97 
 49–59 
5th–8th semifinals:
 72–52 
 95–92 
9th place playoff:  48–62 
11th place playoff:  48–82 
FIBA Europe Under-20 Championship for Women in Latvia:
Semifinals:
 81–65 
 52–56 
5th–8th semifinals:
 59–63 
 55–74 
9th place playoff:  61–50 
11th place playoff:  72–91 
Group G:
 53–80 
 53–85 
Standings (after 5 games): Romania 10 points, Germany 8, Sweden 7, Bulgaria 5.
Sweden and Bulgaria are relegated to Division B.

Cricket
Australia vs Pakistan in England:
2nd Test in Leeds, day 4:
 88 (33.1 overs) and 349 (95.3 overs);  258 (64.5 overs) and 180/7 (50.4 overs). Pakistan win by 3 wickets; 2-match series drawn 1–1.

Cycling
Grand Tours:
Tour de France:
Stage 19:  Fabian Cancellara  1h 00' 56"  Tony Martin  + 17"  Bert Grabsch  + 1' 48"
General classification: (1) Alberto Contador   89h 16' 27" (2) Andy Schleck   + 39" (3) Denis Menchov  + 2' 01"

Darts
PDC Major:
World Matchplay, day 8:
Semi-finals: (ENG unless stated otherwise)
Raymond van Barneveld  def. James Wade 17–8
Phil Taylor def. Simon Whitlock  17–4

Equestrianism
Show jumping:
Global Champions Tour:
7th Competition in Chantilly (CSI 5*):  Laura Kraut  on Cedric  Penelope Leprevost  on Mylord Charthago  Edwina Alexander  on Itot du Chateau
Standings (after 7 of 9 competitions): (1) Marco Kutscher  and Marcus Ehning  182 points (3) Jos Lansink  168

Football (soccer)
2011 FIFA Women's World Cup qualification (UEFA): (teams in strike are eliminated)
Group 1:  3–0 
Standings (after 8 matches):  24 points,  21, Estonia 9,  8, Northern Ireland 7,  1.
FIFA U-20 Women's World Cup in Germany:
Quarterfinals:
 0–2 
 2–0 
UEFA European Under-19 Championship in France: (teams in bold advance to semi-finals)
Group A:
 1–1 
 0–1 
Final standings: France 7 points, England 4, Austria, Netherlands 3.
Group B:
 0–5 
 3–0 
Final standings: Spain 9 points, Croatia 4, Portugal 3, Italy 1.

Golf
Senior majors:
Senior British Open in Carnoustie, Scotland
Leaderboard after third round: (1) Bernhard Langer  207 (−6) (2) Corey Pavin  210 (−3) (3) Six tied at 211 (−2)

Lacrosse
World Championship in Manchester, England:
Final:  Canada  10–12  
The United States win the title for the ninth time, avenging their 2006 final defeat to Canada.
Bronze medal match:  Australia  16–9

Rugby union
Tri Nations Series:
 30–13  in Brisbane
Standings:  10 points (2 matches), Australia 4 (1), South Africa 0 (3).

Six-red snooker
Six-red World Championship in Bangkok, Thailand:
Final: Mark Selby  def. Ricky Walden  8–6

Volleyball
FIVB World League Final Round in Córdoba, Argentina:
Semifinals:
 3–0 
 3–1 
Women's European League Final Four in Ankara, Turkey:
Semifinals:
 0–3 
 2–3 
Central American and Caribbean Games in Mayagüez, Puerto Rico:
Group A:  3–0 
Group B:
 3–0 
 3–1

July 23, 2010 (Friday)

Athletics
World Junior Championships in Moncton, Canada:
Men:
200m:  Shota Iizuka  20.67  Aliaksandr Linnik  20.89  Aaron Brown  21.00
400m hurdles:  Jehue Gordon  49.30  Takatoshi Abe  49.46  Leslie Murray  50.22
10 km walk:  Valery Filipchuk  40:43.17  Zelin Cai  40:43.59  Petr Bogatyrev  40:50.37
High jump:  Mutaz Essa Barshim  2.30 m  David Smith  2.24 m  Naoto Tobe  2.21 m
Javelin throw:  Till Wöschler  82.52 m  Genki Dean  76.44 m  Dmitri Tarabin  76.42 m
Women:
200m:  Stormy Kendrick  22.99  Jodie Williams  23.19  Jamile Samuel  23.27
Long jump:  Irisdaymi Herrera  6.41 m  Wupin Wang  6.23 m  Marharyta Tverdohlib  6.20 m
Heptathlon:  Dafne Schippers  5967 points  Sara Gambetta  5770  Helga Margrét Thorsteinsdóttir  5706

Baseball
European Championship in Germany:
Pool A:
 vs. . Postponed due to inclement weather.
 vs. . Postponed in the first inning due to inclement weather, with the Netherlands leading 2–0.
 0–10 
Pool B:
 1–10 
 9–12 
 9–1 
Men's Central American and Caribbean Games in Mayagüez, Puerto Rico:
Pool A:  0–20 
Pool B:  6–0

Basketball
FIBA Under-17 World Championship for Women in France:
Quarterfinals in Toulouse:
 68–59 
 86–57 
 93–70 
 69–59 
9th–12th semifinals in Rodez:
 88–56 
 59–51 
FIBA Europe Under-20 Championship for Women in Latvia:
Quarterfinals:
 92–72 
 61–69 
 75–74 
 64–57 
9th–12th semifinals:
 66–53 
 78–88 
Group G:
 64–67 
 62–41 
Standings (after 4 games): Romania 8 points, Germany, Sweden 6, Bulgaria 4.

Cricket
Australia vs Pakistan in England:
2nd Test in Leeds, day 3:
 88 (33.1 overs) and 349 (95.3 overs);  258 (64.5 overs) and 140/3 (37 overs). Pakistan require another 40 runs with 7 wickets remaining.

Cycling
Grand Tours:
Tour de France:
Stage 18:  Mark Cavendish  4h 37' 09"  Julian Dean  s.t.  Alessandro Petacchi  s.t.
General classification: (1) Alberto Contador   88h 09' 48" (2) Andy Schleck   + 8" (3) Samuel Sánchez  + 3' 32"

Darts
PDC Major:
World Matchplay, day 7:
Quarter-finals: (ENG unless stated otherwise)
James Wade def. Wayne Jones 16–12
Simon Whitlock  def. Jelle Klaasen  16–8
Raymond van Barneveld  def. Co Stompé  16–12
Phil Taylor def. Kevin Painter 16–4

Football (soccer)
UEFA Europa League Second qualifying round, second leg: (first leg score in parentheses)
UE Sant Julià  0–5 (0–3)  MYPA. MYPA win 8–0 on aggregate.

Golf
Senior majors:
Senior British Open in Carnoustie, Scotland
Leaderboard after second round (USA unless otherwise indicated): (1) Bernhard Langer  and Corey Pavin 138 (−4) (3) Dan Forsman, Jay Haas, Larry Mize and Ian Woosnam  139 (−3)

Volleyball
FIVB World League Final Round in Córdoba, Argentina: (teams in bold advance to the semifinals)
Pool E:  0–3 
Final standings: , Serbia 4 points, Argentina 1.
Pool F:  3–0 
Final standings: , Cuba 4 points, Italy 1.
Women's Central American and Caribbean Games in Mayagüez, Puerto Rico:
Classification 7/8:  0–3 
Classification 5/6:  0–3 
Bronze Medal:  1–3  
Gold Medal:   3–2  
The Dominican Republic win the title for the fifth time.

July 22, 2010 (Thursday)

Athletics
World Junior Championships in Moncton, Canada:
Men:
400m:  Kirani James  45.89  Marcell Deák Nagy  46.09  Errol Nolan  46.36
1500m:  Caleb Mwangangi Ndiku  3:37.30  Abderrahmane Anou  3:38.86  Mohammad Al-Garni  3:38.91
Pole vault:  Anton Ivakin  5.50 m  Claudio Stecchi  5.40 m  Andrew Sutcliffe  5.35 m
Women:
400m:  Shaunae Miller  52.52  Margaret Etim  53.05  Bianca Răzor  53.17
800m:  Elena Mirela Lavric  2:01.85  Cherono Koech  2:02.29  Annet Negesa  2:02.51
100m hurdles:  Isabelle Pedersen  13.30  Jenna Pletsch  13.35  Miriam Hehl  13.46
3000m steeplechase:  Purity Cherotich Kirui  9:36.34  Birtukan Adamu  9:43.23  Lucia Kamene Muangi  9:43.71
Discus throw:  Yaime Pérez  56.01 m  Erin Pendleton  54.96 m  Yuliya Kurylo  53.96 m
Triple jump:  Dailenys Alcántara  14.09 m  Laura Samuel  13.75 m  Lina Deng  13.72 m
IAAF Diamond League:
Herculis in Fontvieille, Monaco:
Men:
200m: Tyson Gay  19.72
400m: Jermaine Gonzales  44.40
800m: Abubaker Kaki Khamis  1:43.10
1500m: Silas Kiplagat  3:29.27
110m hurdles: David Oliver  13.01
400m hurdles: Bershawn Jackson  47.78
Discus throw: Gerd Kanter  67.81 m
High jump: Ivan Ukhov  2.34 m
Long jump: Dwight Phillips  8.46 m
Women:
100m: Carmelita Jeter  10.82
800m: Alysia Johnson  1:57.34
3000m: Sentayehu Ejigu  8:28.41
100m hurdles: Lolo Jones  12.63
400m hurdles: Kaliese Spencer  53.63
Javelin throw: Barbora Špotáková  65.76 m
Pole vault: Fabiana Murer  4.80 m
Shot put: Nadzeya Astapchuk  20.23 m
Triple jump: Yargelis Savigne  15.09 m

Baseball
Men's Central American and Caribbean Games in Mayagüez, Puerto Rico:
Pool A:
 6–7 
 6–0 
Pool B:  0–0 (suspended)

Cricket
Australia vs Pakistan in England:
2nd Test in Leeds, day 2:
 88 (33.1 overs) and 136/2 (41 overs);  258 (64.5 overs). Australia trail by 34 runs with 8 wickets remaining.
India in Sri Lanka:
1st Test in Galle, day 5:
 520/8d (124 overs) and 96/0 (14.1 overs);  276 (65 overs) and 338 (f/o; 115.4 overs; Lasith Malinga 5-50). Sri Lanka win by 10 wickets; lead 3-match series 1–0.
Muttiah Muralitharan ends his Test career with exactly 800 wickets, after claiming the wicket of Pragyan Ojha to end the Indian innings.

Cycling
Grand Tours:
Tour de France:
Stage 17:  Andy Schleck   5h 03' 29"  Alberto Contador   s.t.  Joaquim Rodríguez  + 1' 18"
General classification: (1) Contador  83h 32' 39" (2) Schleck  + 8" (3) Samuel Sánchez  + 3' 32"

Darts
PDC Major:
World Matchplay, day 6:
Second round: (ENG unless stated otherwise)
Jelle Klaasen  def. Gary Anderson  14–12
Kevin Painter def. Mark Walsh 14–12
Phil Taylor def. Steve Beaton 13–4
Simon Whitlock  def. Steve Brown 13–10

Fencing
European Championships in Leipzig, Germany:
Men's Épée Team:
Final:   def.   45–39
 
Women's Sabre Team:
Final:   def.   45–38

Football (soccer)
UEFA Europa League Second qualifying round, second leg: (first leg score in parentheses)
Mika  0–0 (0–1)  Rabotnički. Rabotnički win 1–0 on aggregate.
Teteks  3–1 (0–0)  Ventspils. Teteks win 3–1 on aggregate.
Torpedo Zhodino  0–1 (2–2)  OFK Beograd. OFK Beograd win 3–2 on aggregate.
Dukla Banská Bystrica  1–0 (0–3)  Zestafoni. Zestafoni win 3–1 on aggregate.
Mogren  2–1 (0–2)  Maccabi Tel Aviv. Maccabi Tel Aviv win 3–2 on aggregate.
Spartak Zlatibor Voda  2–0 (3–3)  Differdange. Spartak Zlatibor Voda win 5–3 on aggregate.
Sillamäe Kalev  0–5 (1–5)  Dinamo Minsk. Dinamo Minsk win 10–1 on aggregate.
Jelgava  2–1 (0–1)  Molde. 2–2 on aggregate; Molde win on away goals rule.
Qarabağ   1–1 (2–1) Portadown. Qarabağ win 3–2 on aggregate.
TPS  1–2 (1–0)  Cercle Brugge. 2–2 on aggregate; Cercle Brugge win on away goals rule.
Široki Brijeg  0–1 (2–2)  Austria Wien. Austria Wien win 3–2 on aggregate.
Baník Ostrava  0–0 (6–0)  WIT Georgia. Baník Ostrava win 6–0 on aggregate.
Dnepr Mogilev  1–1 (2–2)  Stabæk. 3–3 on aggregate; Dnepr Mogilev win on away goals rule.
Karpaty Lviv  3–2 (3–0)  KR Reykjavík. Karpaty Lviv win 6–2 on aggregate.
Dacia  0–2 (0–0)  Kalmar FF. Kalmar FF win 2–0 on aggregate.
Dinamo Tbilisi  2–1 (2–1)  Gefle. Dinamo Tbilisi win 4–2 on aggregate.
APOEL  3–1 (3–0)  Tauras Tauragė. APOEL win 6–1 on aggregate.
Iskra-Stal  0–1 (1–2)  IF Elfsborg. IF Elfsborg win 3–1 on aggregate.
Randers  1–1 (3–0)  Gorica. Randers win 4–1 on aggregate.
Bnei Yehuda  0–1 (1–1)  Shamrock Rovers. Shamrock Rovers win 2–1 on aggregate.
KF Tirana  1–1 (0–4)  Utrecht. Utrecht win 5–1 on aggregate.
Dinamo București  5–1 (2–0)  Olimpia. Dinamo București win 7–1 on aggregate.
Vaduz  0–0 (0–3)  Brøndby. Brøndby win 3–0 on aggregate.
Wisła Kraków  5–0 (2–0)  Šiauliai. Wisła Kraków win 7–0 on aggregate.
Dundalk  0–2 (0–6)  Levski Sofia. Levski Sofia win 8–0 on aggregate.
Ruch Chorzów  0–0 (1–1)  Valletta. 1–1 on aggregate; Ruch Chorzów win on away goals rule.
Víkingur  0–4 (0–3)  Beşiktaş. Beşiktaş win 7–0 on aggregate.
Tre Penne  2–9 (1–4)  Zrinjski. Zrinjski win 13–3 on aggregate.
Győri ETO  2–0 (3–0)  Atyrau. Győri ETO win 5–0 on aggregate.
Olympiacos  6–1 (5–0)  Besa Kavajë. Olympiacos win 11–1 on aggregate.
Bangor City  2–1 (1–1)  Honka. Bangor City win 3–2 on aggregate.
Maribor  2–0 (1–1)  Videoton. Maribor win 3–1 on aggregate.
Rapid Wien  4–2 (2–0)  Sūduva Marijampolė. Rapid Wien win 6–2 on aggregate.
Šibenik  0–3 (a.e.t.) (2–0)  Anorthosis. Anorthosis win 3–2 on aggregate.
Sporting Fingal  2–3 (2–3)  Marítimo. Marítimo win 6–4 on aggregate.
Borac Banja Luka  1–1 (0–1)  Lausanne-Sport. Lausanne-Sport win 2–1 on aggregate.
Cibalia  0–0 (0–1)  Cliftonville. Cliftonville win 1–0 on aggregate.
Budućnost Podgorica  1–2 (3–0)  Baku. Budućnost Podgorica win 4–2 on aggregate.
Breiðablik  0–1 (0–1)  Motherwell. Motherwell win 2–0 on aggregate.
UE Sant Julià  – (0–3)  MYPA. Match abandoned after 80 minutes due to adverse weather, with MYPA leading 1–0 on the night.

Golf
Senior majors:
Senior British Open in Carnoustie, Scotland
Leaderboard after first round: (1) Jay Don Blake , Bernhard Langer  and Carl Mason  67 (−4)

Lacrosse
World Championship in Manchester, England:
Semifinals:
Canada  15–6 
United States  20–5

Open water swimming
World Championships in Lac Saint-Jean, Quebec, Canada:
Men's 25K:  Alex Meyer   Valerio Cleri   Petar Stoychev 
Women's 25K:  Linsy Heister   Margarita Minguez Cabezas   Celia Barrot

Volleyball
FIVB World League Final Round in Córdoba, Argentina: (teams in bold advance to the semifinals)
Pool E:  2–3 
Standings: Brazil 4 points (2 matches), Serbia,  1 (1)
Pool F:  3–2 
Standings: Russia 4 points (2 matches), Cuba,  1 (1)
Women's Central American and Caribbean Games in Mayagüez, Puerto Rico:
Classification 5/8:
 2–3 
 0–3 
Semifinals:
 3–0 
 3–0

July 21, 2010 (Wednesday)

Athletics
World Junior Championships in Moncton, Canada:
Men:
100m:  Dexter Lee  10.21  Charles Silmon  10.23  Jimmy Vicaut  10.28
Long jump:  Luvo Manyonga  7.99 m  Eusebio Cáceres  7.90 m  Taylor Stewart  7.63 m
Shot put:  Jacko Gill  20.76 m  Božidar Antunovic  20.20 m  Yongheng Ding  20.14 m
Decathlon:  Kevin Mayer  7928 points  Ilya Shkurenev  7830  Marcus Nilsson  7751
Women:
100m:  Jodie Williams  11.40  Takeia Pinckney  11.49  Jamile Samuel  11.56
5000m:  Genzebe Dibaba  15:08.06  Mercy Cherono  15:09.19  Alice Aprot Nawowuna  15:17.39
10 km walk:  Elena Lashmanova  44:11.90  Anna Lukyanova  44:17.98  Kumiko Okada  45:56.15
Javelin throw:  Sanni Utriainen  56.69 m  Līna Mūze  56.64 m  Tazmin Brits  54.55 m

Baseball
Men's Central American and Caribbean Games in Mayagüez, Puerto Rico:
Pool A:
 0–1 
 2–3 
Pool B:
 10–1 
 0–0 (suspended)

Basketball
FIBA Under-17 World Championship for Women in France: (teams in bold advance to the quarterfinals)
Group A in Rodez:
 51–64 
 133–71 
 60–81 
Final standings: USA 10 points, France 8, Russia, Japan, Turkey 7, Canada 6.
Group B in Toulouse:
 61–67 
 49–75 
 77–58 
Final standings: Belgium, China 9 points, Australia 8, Spain, Argentina 7, Mali 5.
FIBA Europe Under-20 Championship for Women in Latvia: (teams in bold advance to the quarterfinals)
Group E:
 76–59 
 60–71 
 67–50 
Final standings: Russia, Latvia 9 points, France 8, Ukraine 7, Poland, Netherlands 6.
Group F:
 89–72 
 72–54 
 57–80 
Final standings: Spain 10 points, Lithuania, Turkey, Serbia 8, Belarus 6, Italy 5.
Group G:
 52–72 
 50–70 
Standings (after 3 games): Romania 6 points, Germany 5, Sweden 4, Bulgaria 3.

Cricket
Australia vs Pakistan in England:
2nd Test in Leeds, day 1:
 88 (33.1 overs);  148/3 (39 overs). Pakistan lead by 60 runs with 7 wickets remaining in the 1st innings.
India in Sri Lanka:
1st Test in Galle, day 4:
 520/8d (124 overs);  276 (65 overs; Virender Sehwag 109, Muttiah Muralitharan 5-63) and 181/5 (f/o; 59.3 overs). India trail by 63 runs with 5 wickets remaining.

Darts
PDC Major:
World Matchplay, day 5:
Second round: (ENG unless stated otherwise)
Wayne Jones def. Ronnie Baxter 13–9
Co Stompé  def. Mark Webster  13–9
James Wade def. Vincent van der Voort  13–10
Raymond van Barneveld  def. Alan Tabern 13–5

Fencing
European Championships in Leipzig, Germany:
Men's Foil Team:
Final:   def.   45–33
  Great Britain
Women's Épée Team:
Final:   def.   35–30

Football (soccer)
FIFA U-20 Women's World Cup in Germany: (teams in bold advance to the quarterfinals)
Group C:
 3–1 
 1–1 
Final standings: Mexico, Nigeria 5 points, Japan 4, England 1.
Group D:
 0–1  United States
 2–0 
Final standings: United States 7 points, Korea Republic 6, Ghana 4, Switzerland 0.
UEFA European Under-19 Championship in France: (teams in bold advance to the semi-finals)
Group A:
 5–0 
 1–0 
Standings (after 2 matches): France 6 points, Netherlands, England 3, Austria 0.
Group B:
 2–1 
 0–0 
Standings (after 2 matches): Spain 6 points, Portugal 3, Croatia, Italy 1.
UEFA Champions League Second qualifying round, second leg: (first leg score in parentheses)
Olimpi Rustavi  1–1 (0–2)  Aktobe. Aktobe win 3–1 on aggregate.
Pyunik  0–1 (1–3)  Partizan. Partizan win 4–1 on aggregate.
Jeunesse Esch  0–0 (0–1)  AIK. AIK win 1–0 on aggregate.
HJK Helsinki  2–0 (a.e.t.) (0–1)  Ekranas. HJK Helsinki win 2–1 on aggregate.
Žilina  3–0 (0–1)  Birkirkara. Žilina win 3–1 on aggregate.
Sparta Prague  2–0 (3–0)  Liepājas Metalurgs. Sparta Prague win 5–0 on aggregate.
Debrecen  3–2 (1–1)  Levadia. Debrecen win 4–3 on aggregate.
Lech Poznań  0–1 (a.e.t.) (1–0)  Inter Baku. 1–1 on aggregate; Lech Poznań win 9–8 on penalties.
Željezničar  0–1 (0–5)  Hapoel Tel Aviv. Hapoel Tel Aviv win 6–0 on aggregate.
Rosenborg  2–0 (0–0)  Linfield. Rosenborg win 2–0 on aggregate.
FH  0–1 (1–5)  BATE. BATE win 6–1 on aggregate.

Volleyball
FIVB World League Final Round in Córdoba, Argentina:
Pool E:  3–2 
Pool F:  2–3 
Women's Central American and Caribbean Games in Mayagüez, Puerto Rico:
Quarterfinals:
 3–0 
 1–3

July 20, 2010 (Tuesday)

Athletics
World Junior Championships in Moncton, Canada:
Men:
10,000m:  Dennis Chepkongin Masai  27:53.89  Gebretsadik Abraha  28:03.45  Paul Kipchumba Lonyangata  29:11.75
Women:
Shot put:  Geisa Arcanjo  17.02 m  Qianqian Meng  16.94 m  Shuang Cui  16.13 m

Baseball
Men's Central American and Caribbean Games in Mayagüez, Puerto Rico:
Pool A:
 0–9 
 0–0 (suspended) 
Major League Baseball news:
Chicago Cubs manager Lou Piniella announces his retirement, effective at the end of the 2010 season. (ESPN)

Basketball
FIBA Under-17 World Championship for Women in France: (teams in bold advance to the quarterfinals, teams in strike are eliminated)
Group A in Rodez:
 61–78 
 55–84 
 70–67 
Standings (after 4 games): USA 8 points, Japan, Russia, France 6, Canada, Turkey 5.
Group B in Toulouse:
 90–80 
 39–88 
 38–68 
Standings (after 4 games): Belgium, China, Australia 7 points, Spain 6, Argentina 5, Mali 4.
FIBA Europe Under-20 Championship for Women in Latvia: (teams in bold advance to the quarterfinals, teams in strike are eliminated)
Group E:
 86–73 
 67–70 
 62–75 
Standings (after 4 games): Latvia, France, Russia 7 points, Ukraine, Netherlands, Poland 5.
Group F:
 80–68 
 61–60 
 75–71 
Standings (after 4 games): Spain 8 points, Turkey 7, Lithuania, Serbia 6, Belarus 5, Italy 4.
Group G:
 70–58 
 67–50 
Standings (after 2 games): Romania, Germany 4 points, Bulgaria, Sweden 2.

Cricket
India in Sri Lanka:
1st Test in Galle, day 3:
 520/8d (124 overs; Tharanga Paranavitana 111);  140/3 (29.4 overs). India trail by 380 runs with 7 wickets remaining in the 1st innings.
Bangladesh vs Netherlands in Scotland:
Only ODI in Glasgow:
 199/7 (30/30 overs);  200/4 (28.5 overs). Netherlands win by 6 wickets.

Cycling
Grand Tours:
Tour de France:
Stage 16:  Pierrick Fédrigo  5h 31' 43"  Sandy Casar  s.t.  Rubén Plaza  s.t.
General classification: (1) Alberto Contador   78h 29' 10" (2) Andy Schleck   + 8" (3) Samuel Sánchez  + 2' 00"

Darts
PDC Major:
World Matchplay, day 4:
First round: (ENG unless stated otherwise)
Kevin Painter def. Colin Lloyd 11–9
Mark Walsh def. Mark Dudbridge 12–10
Phil Taylor def. Barrie Bates  10–6
Steve Beaton def. Paul Nicholson  10–3

Fencing
European Championships in Leipzig, Germany:
Men's Sabre Team:
Final:   def.   45–28
 
Women's Foil Team:
Final:   def.   45–26

Football (soccer)
FIFA U-20 Women's World Cup in Germany: (teams in bold advance to the semifinals)
Group A:
 1–4 
 0–3 
Final standings: Germany 9 points, Colombia, France 4, Costa Rica 0.
Group B:
 1–4 
 2–3 
Final standings: Sweden 7 points, Korea DPR 6, Brazil 4, New Zealand 0.
UEFA Champions League Second qualifying round, second leg: (first leg score in parentheses)
Renova  0–2 (0–3)  Omonia. Omonia win 5–0 on aggregate.
HB Tórshavn  1–0 (0–5)  Red Bull Salzburg. Red Bull Salzburg win 5–1 on aggregate.
Dinamo Tirana  1–0 (1–3)  FC Sheriff. FC Sheriff win 3–2 on aggregate.
The New Saints  4–0 (0–1)  Bohemians. The New Saints win 4–1 on aggregate.
Koper  3–0 (1–5)  Dinamo Zagreb. Dinamo Zagreb win 5–4 on aggregate.
Rudar Pljevlja  0–4 (0–1)  Litex Lovech. Litex Lovech win 5–0 on aggregate.

Open water swimming
World Championships in Lac Saint-Jean, Quebec, Canada:
Men's 5K:  Thomas Lurz   Evgeny Frattsev   Fran Crippen 
Women's 5K:  Eva Fabian   Giorgia Consiglio   Ana Cunha

Volleyball
Women's Central American and Caribbean Games in Mayagüez, Puerto Rico:
Group A:
 0–3 
 3–0 
Final standings: Dominican Republic 6 points, Costa Rica 5, Trinidad and Tobago 4, Barbados 3.
Group B:
 2–3 
 3–0 
Final standings: Puerto Rico 6 points, Mexico 5, Guatemala 4, Nicaragua 3.

July 19, 2010 (Monday)

Athletics
World Junior Championships in Moncton, Canada:
Women's 3000m:  Mercy Cherono  8:55.07  Emebet Anteneh  8:55.24  Layes Abdullayeva  8:55.33

Basketball
FIBA Europe Under-20 Championship for Women in Latvia: (teams in bold advance to the quarterfinals)
Group E:
 63–49 
 66–80 
 74–53 
Standings (after 3 games): France 6 points, Latvia, Russia 5, Netherlands, Poland 4, Ukraine 3
Group F:
 63–57 
 69–91 
 58–67 
Standings (after 3 games): Spain, Turkey 6 points, Lithuania 5, Serbia 4, Belarus, Italy 3
Group G:
 51–80 
 57–84

Cricket
India in Sri Lanka:
1st Test in Galle, day 2:
 256/2 (68 overs; Tharanga Paranavitana 110*); .
Rain prevented play on Day 2.
Bangladesh in Scotland:
Only ODI in Glasgow:
 vs. . Match abandoned without a ball bowled.

Cycling
Grand Tours:
Tour de France:
Stage 15:  Thomas Voeckler  4h 44' 51"  Alessandro Ballan  + 1' 20"  Aitor Pérez  + 1' 20"
General classification: (1) Alberto Contador   72h 50' 42" (2) Andy Schleck   + 8" (3) Samuel Sánchez  + 2' 00"

Darts
PDC Major:
World Matchplay, day 3:
First round: (ENG unless stated otherwise)
Steve Brown def. Terry Jenkins 10–6
Simon Whitlock  def. Tony Eccles 10–1
Gary Anderson  def. Robert Thornton  10–0
Jelle Klaasen  def. Mervyn King 10–4

Fencing
European Championships in Leipzig, Germany:
Men's Épée Individual:
Final:  Jean-Michel Lucenay  def.  Gábor Boczkó  15–11
 Radosław Zawrotniak  and Pavel Sukhov 
Women's Sabre Individual:
Final:  Svetlana Kormilitsyna  def.  Sophia Velikaia  15–13
 Ilaria Bianco  and Sibylle Klemm

Volleyball
Women's Central American and Caribbean Games in Mayagüez, Puerto Rico:
Group A:
 0–3 
 3–2 
Standings (after 2 matches): Dominican Republic 4 points, Trinidad and Tobago, Costa Rica 3, Barbados 2.
Group B:
 0–3 
 0–3 
Standings (after 2 matches): Puerto Rico, Mexico 4 points, Nicaragua, Guatemala 2.

July 18, 2010 (Sunday)

Auto racing
IndyCar Series:
Honda Indy Toronto in Toronto, Canada: (1) Will Power  (Team Penske) (2) Dario Franchitti  (Chip Ganassi Racing) (3) Ryan Hunter-Reay  (Andretti Autosport)
Drivers' championship standings (after 10 of 17 races): (1) Power 377 points (2) Franchitti 335 (3) Scott Dixon  (Chip Ganassi Racing) 299
World Touring Car Championship:
Race of UK:
Round 11: (1) Yvan Muller  (Chevrolet; Chevrolet Cruze) (2) Robert Huff  (Chevrolet; Chevrolet Cruze) (3) Colin Turkington  (eBay Motors/WSR; BMW 320si)
Round 12: (1) Andy Priaulx  (BMW Team RBM; BMW 320si) (2) Turkington (3) Gabriele Tarquini  (SR-Sport; SEAT León)
Drivers' championship standings (after 12 of 22 rounds): (1) Muller 199 points (2) Tarquini 176 (3) Priaulx 148
Manufacturers' championship standings: (1) Chevrolet 378 points (2) SEAT Customers Technology 361 (3) BMW 317

Basketball
FIBA Under-17 World Championship for Women in France: (teams in bold advance to the quarterfinals)
Group A in Rodez:
 114–57 
 53–56 
 80–60 
Standings (after 3 games): USA 6 points, Japan 5, Russia, Turkey, France, Canada 4.
Group B in Toulouse:
 77–57 
 54–55 
 103–54 
Standings (after 3 games): China 6 points, Belgium, Australia 5, Spain, Argentina 4, Mali 3.

Cricket
India in Sri Lanka:
1st Test in Galle, day 1:
 256/2 (68 overs; Tharanga Paranavitana 110*, Kumar Sangakkara 103); .

Cycling
Grand Tours:
Tour de France:
Stage 14:  Christophe Riblon  4h 52' 42"  Denis Menchov  + 54"  Samuel Sánchez  + 54"
General classification: (1) Andy Schleck   68h 02' 30" (2) Alberto Contador  + 31" (3) Sánchez + 2' 31"

Darts
PDC Major:
World Matchplay, day 2:
First round: (ENG unless stated otherwise)
Co Stompé  def. Andy Hamilton 12–10
Mark Webster  def. Adrian Lewis 11–9
James Wade def. Andy Smith 10–8
Alan Tabern def. Wes Newton 12–10

Equestrianism
Dressage:
Großer Dressurpreis von Aachen – Grand Prix Freestyle (CDIO 5*) in Aachen:  Edward Gal  on Totilas  Adelinde Cornelissen  on Parzival  Imke Schellekens-Bartels  on Sunrise
Show jumping:
Großer Preis von Aachen in Aachen (CSIO 5*):  Eric Lamaze  on Hickstead  Pius Schwizer  on Carlina  Sergio Alvarez Moya  on Action-Breaker

Fencing
European Championships in Leipzig, Germany:
Men's Foil individual:
Final:  Andrea Baldini  def.  Valerio Aspromonte  15–11
 Renal Ganeev  & Richard Kruse 
Women's Epée individual:
Final:  Imke Duplitzer  def.  Magdalena Piekarska  15–10
 Laura Flessel-Colovic  & Noam Mills

Field hockey
Women's Champions Trophy in Nottingham, England:
Place 5/6:  3–4 
Place 3/4:   2–1 
Final:   2–4  
Argentina win their third consecutive title and fourth overall.

Football (soccer)
UEFA European Under-19 Championship in France:
Group A:
 2–3 
 4–1 
Group B:
 1–2 
 0–2 
CAF Champions League group stage, matchday 1:
Group A: Dynamos  0–2  TP Mazembe
Group B:
Ismaily  0–1  JS Kabylie
Heartland  1–1  Al-Ahly
CAF Confederation Cup Play-off for group stage, first leg:
Al-Hilal  5–0  CAPS United

Golf
Men's majors:
The Open Championship in St. Andrews, Scotland: (ENG unless stated)
(1) Louis Oosthuizen  272 (−16) (2) Lee Westwood 279 (−9) (3) Paul Casey, Rory McIlroy  and Henrik Stenson  280 (−8)
Oosthuizen wins his first major, and becomes the first South African to win a major since Trevor Immelman won the 2008 U.S. Masters.
PGA Tour:
Reno-Tahoe Open in Reno, Nevada:
Winner: Matt Bettencourt  277 (−11)
Bettencourt wins his first PGA Tour event.

Motorcycle racing
Moto GP:
German motorcycle Grand Prix in Saxony, Germany:
MotoGP: (1) Dani Pedrosa  (Honda) (2) Jorge Lorenzo  (Yamaha) (3) Casey Stoner  (Ducati)
Riders' championship standings (after 8 of 18 rounds): (1) Lorenzo 185 points (2) Pedrosa 138 (3) Andrea Dovizioso  (Honda) 102
Manufacturers' championship standings: (1) Yamaha 190 points (2) Honda 162 (3) Ducati 113
Moto2: (1) Toni Elías  (Moriwaki) (2) Andrea Iannone  (Speed Up) (3) Roberto Rolfo  (Suter)
Riders' championship standings (after 8 of 17 rounds): (1) Elías 136 points (2) Thomas Lüthi  (Moriwaki) 94 (3) Iannone 90
Manufacturers' championship standings: (1) Moriwaki 161 points (2) Suter 143 (3) Speed Up 106
125cc: (1) Marc Márquez  (Derbi) (2) Tomoyoshi Koyama  (Aprilia) (3) Sandro Cortese  (Derbi)
Riders' championship standings (after 8 of 17 rounds): (1) Márquez 157 points (2) Pol Espargaró  (Derbi) 131 (3) Nicolás Terol  (Aprilia) 118
Manufacturers' championship standings: (1) Derbi 195 points (2) Aprilia 161 (3) Honda 11

Open water swimming
World Championships in Lac Saint-Jean, Quebec, Canada:
Men's 10K:  Valerio Cleri   Evgeny Drattsev   Vladimir Dyatchin

Tennis
ATP World Tour:
MercedesCup in Stuttgart, Germany:
Final: Albert Montañés  def. Gaël Monfils  6–2, 1–2, ret.
Montanes wins his second title of the year and fifth of his career.
Swedish Open in Båstad, Sweden:
Final: Nicolás Almagro  def. Robin Söderling  7–5, 3–6, 6–2
Almagro wins the sixth title of his career.
WTA Tour:
Internazionali Femminili di Palermo in Palermo, Italy:
Final: Kaia Kanepi  def. Flavia Pennetta  6–4, 6–3
Kanepi wins the first title of her career.
ECM Prague Open in Prague, Czech Republic:
Final: Ágnes Szávay  def. Barbora Záhlavová-Strýcová  6–2, 1–6, 6–2
Szávay wins her second title in successive weeks and the fifth title of her career.

Volleyball
Women's European League, Week 7: (teams in bold advance to the Final Four)
Pool A:  2–3 
Final standings: Serbia 23 points, Bulgaria 21,  16,  12.
Pool B:  3–0 
Final standings: Turkey 21 points,  20, Spain 18,  13.
Women's Central American and Caribbean Games in Mayagüez, Puerto Rico:
Group A:
 3–0 
 3–0 
Group B:
 3–0 
 3–0

Water polo
FINA Men's World League Super Final in Niš, Serbia:
7th place playoff:  11–5 
5th place playoff:  7–6 
3rd place playoff:   9–7 
Final:   10–10 (4–2 pen.)  
Serbia win the title for the fifth time.

July 17, 2010 (Saturday)

Auto racing
Nationwide Series:
Missouri-Illinois Dodge Dealers 250 in Madison, Illinois: (1)  Carl Edwards (Ford; Roush Fenway Racing) (2)  Reed Sorenson (Toyota; Braun Racing) (3)  Trevor Bayne (Toyota; Diamond-Waltrip Racing)
Drivers' championship standings (after 19 of 35 races): (1)  Brad Keselowski (Dodge; Penske Racing) 3042 points (2) Edwards 2814 (3)  Justin Allgaier (Dodge; Penske Racing) 2545
Edwards was docked 60 points on July 21, extending Keselowski's championship lead to 228, after intentionally crashing into Keselowski on the final lap of the race. He was also fined $60,000 and placed on probation for the rest of the season. Keselowski was also placed on a similar probation to the end of the season. (ESPN)

Basketball
FIBA Under-17 World Championship for Women in France:
Group A in Rodez:
 80–87 
 38–82 
 51–54 
Standings (after 2 games): USA 4 points, Russia, Japan, Canada, Turkey 3, France 2.
Group B in Toulouse:
 55–53 
 75–92 
 42–112 
Standings (after 2 games): China 4 points, Argentina, Belgium, Australia, Spain 3, Mali 2.
FIBA Europe Under-20 Championship for Women in Latvia: (teams in bold advance to Qualifying Round)
Group A in Liepāja:
 32–63 
 31–80 
Final standings: France 6 points, Poland 5, Netherlands 4, Bulgaria 3.
Group B in Liepāja:
 71–61 
 61–90 
Final standings: Russia, Latvia 5 points, Ukraine, Sweden 4.
Group C in Grobiņa:
 49–35 
 67–75 
Final standings: Spain 6 points, Serbia 5, Italy 4, Germany 3.
Group D in Grobiņa:
 89–63 
 64–62 
Final standings: Turkey 6 points, Lithuania 5, Belarus 4, Romania 3.

Cycling
Grand Tours:
Tour de France:
Stage 13:  Alexander Vinokourov   4h 26' 26"  Mark Cavendish  + 13"  Alessandro Petacchi  + 13"
General classification: (1) Andy Schleck   63h 08' 40" (2) Alberto Contador  + 31" (3) Samuel Sánchez  + 2' 45"

Darts
PDC Major:
World Matchplay, day 1:
First round: (ENG unless stated otherwise)
Raymond van Barneveld  def. Denis Ovens 10–1
Vincent van der Voort  def. Dennis Priestley 10–6
Ronnie Baxter def. Jamie Caven 10–7
Wayne Jones def. Colin Osborne 10–8

Equestrianism
Eventing:
CICO 3* in Aachen:
Team result (Nations Cup of Germany):   (Michael Jung on River of Joy, Ingrid Klimke on FRH Butts Abraxxas, Andreas Dibowski on Butts Leon, Dirk Schrade on King Artus)   (Linda Algotsson on Stand By Me, Niklas Jonsson on First Lady, Katrin Norling on Pandora Emm, Malin Larsson on Piccadilly Z)   Great Britain (Emily Baldwin on Drivetime, Ruth Edge on Carnaval Prince II, Pippa Funnell on Mirage d'Elle, Nicola Wilson on Bee Diplomatic)
Individual result:  Andrew Nicholson  on Nereo  Dibowski  Schrade
Dressage:
Aachen (CDIO 5*):
Nations Cup of Germany:   (Adelinde Cornelissen on Parzival, Edward Gal on Totilas, Imke Schellekens-Bartels on Sunrise)   (Christoph Koschel on Donnperignon, Matthias-Alexander Rath on Sterntaler-UNICEF, Isabell Werth on Satchmo)   Great Britain (Laura Bechtolsheimer on Mistral Hojris, Fiona Bigwood on Wie-Atlántico de Ymas, Emile Faurie on Elmegardens Marequis)
Grand Prix Spécial (individual result):  Gal  Cornelissen  Bechtolsheimer
Four-in-hand-driving:
Nations Cup of Germany in Aachen (CAIO):
Team result:   (IJsbrand Chardon, Koos de Ronde, Theo Timmerman)   (Michael Brauchle, Rainer Duen, Christoph Sandmann)   (Felix Affrini, Werner Ulrich, Daniel Würgler)
Individual result:  Boyd Exell   Chardon  Sandmann
Show jumping:
Best of Champions in Aachen (CSIO 5*):  Kevin Staut   Jos Lansink   Denis Lynch

Fencing
European Championships in Leipzig, Germany:
Men's Sabre Individual:
Final:  Aleksey Yakimenko  def.  Nicolas Limbach  15–13
 Oleh Shturbabin  & Boladé Apithy 
Women's Foil Individual:
Final:  Valentina Vezzali  def.  Yevgeniya Lamonova  15–4
 Inna Deriglazova  & Elisa Di Francisca

Field hockey
Women's Champions Trophy in Nottingham, England: (teams in bold advance to the final)
 1–0 
 2–2 
 3–4 
Final standings: Netherlands 12 points, Argentina, England 10, Germany 7, China 3, New Zealand 1.

Football (soccer)
FIFA U-20 Women's World Cup in Germany: (teams in bold advance to the quarterfinals, teams in strike are eliminated)
Group C:
 2–1 
 0–1 
Standings (after 2 matches): Mexico, Nigeria 4 points, Japan, England 1.
Group D:
 2–4 
United States  5–0 
Standings (after 2 matches): Korea Republic 6 points, USA 4, Ghana 1, Switzerland 0.
CAF Confederation Cup Play-off for group stage, first leg:
Al-Merreikh  2–2  ASFAN
Atlético Petróleos Luanda  0–0  CS Sfaxien
Zanaco  4–0  Enyimba
Gaborone United  1–0  Haras El Hodood
Supersport United  2–1  FUS Rabat
Djoliba  0–0  CR Belouizdad

Golf
Men's majors:
The Open Championship in St Andrews, Fife, Scotland:
Leaderboard after third round: (1) Louis Oosthuizen  201 (−15) (2) Paul Casey  205 (−11) (3) Martin Kaymer  208 (−8)

Open water swimming
World Championships in Lac Saint-Jean, Quebec, Canada:
Women's 10K:  Martina Grimaldi   Giorgia Consiglio   Fang Yanqiao

Rugby league
European Shield in Hochspeyer:
 96–0

Rugby union
2011 Rugby World Cup qualifying:
Final Place Play-off Preliminary Round:
 56–13  in Buzău
 44–7  in Montevideo
Tri Nations Series:
 31–17  in Wellington
Standings: New Zealand 10 points (2 matches),  0 (0), South Africa 0 (2)

Volleyball
Men's European League Final Four in Guadalajara, Spain:
Bronze medal match:  2–3  
Final:   3–1  
Portugal win the title for the first time.
Women's European League, Week 7: (teams in bold advance to the Final Four, teams in strike are eliminated)
Pool A:  0–3 
Standings: Serbia 21 points (11 matches), Bulgaria 20 (11),  16 (12),  12 (12).
Pool B:
 3–0 
 0–3 
Standings: Israel 20 points (12 matches), Turkey 19 (11), Spain 17 (11), Greece 13 (12).

Water polo
FINA Men's World League Super Final in Niš, Serbia:
Semi-finals:
 11–14 
 6–8 
5th–8th places:
 13–6 
 12–1

July 16, 2010 (Friday)

Athletics
IAAF Diamond League:
Meeting Areva in Paris, France:
Men:
100m: Usain Bolt  9.84
400m: Jeremy Wariner  44.49
800m: Abubaker Kaki Khamis  1:43.50
110m hurdles: David Oliver  12.89
3000m steeplechase: Brimin Kipruto  8:00.90
4 × 100 m relay:  Great Britain 38.70
Javelin throw: Andreas Thorkildsen  87.50 m
Pole vault: Renaud Lavillenie  5.91 m
Triple jump: Arnie David Giralt  17.49 m
Women:
200m: Allyson Felix  22.14
1500m: Anna Alminova  3:57.65
5000m: Vivian Cheruiyot  14:27.41
Discus throw: Yarelis Barrios  65.53 m
High jump: Blanka Vlašić  2.02 m
Long jump: Brittney Reese  6.79 m
Shot put: Nadzeya Astapchuk  20.78 m

Basketball
FIBA Under-17 World Championship for Women in France:
Group A in Rodez:
 68–93 
 73–82 
 70–45 
Group B in Toulouse:
 72–54 
 80–27 
 57–58 
FIBA Europe Under-20 Championship for Women in Latvia: (teams in bold advance to Qualifying Round)
Group A in Liepāja:
 50–40 
 83–52 
Standings (after 2 games): France, Poland 4 points, Bulgaria, Netherlands 2.
Group B in Liepāja:
 58–89 
 73–68 (OT) 
Standings (after 2 games): Russia 4 points, Latvia, Ukraine 3, Sweden 2.
Group C in Grobiņa:
 80–60 
 79–43 
Standings (after 2 games): Serbia, Spain 4 points, Italy, Germany 2.
Group D in Grobiņa:
 75–61 
 77–36 
Standings (after 2 games): Lithuania, Turkey 4 points, Belarus, Romania 2.

Cricket
Australia vs Pakistan in England
1st Test in London, day 4:
 253 (76.5 overs) and 334 (91 overs);  148 (40.5 overs) and 289 (91.1 overs). Australia win by 150 runs; lead 2-match series 1–0.
Bangladesh in Ireland:
2nd ODI in Stormont, Belfast:
 189/9 (46/46 overs);  191/4 (37.4 overs). Bangladesh win by 6 wickets (D/L); 2-match series drawn 1–1.

Cycling
Grand Tours:
Tour de France:
Stage 12:  Joaquim Rodríguez  4h 58' 26"  Alberto Contador  s.t.  Alexander Vinokourov  + 4"
General classification: (1) Andy Schleck   58h 42' 01" (2) Contador + 31" (3) Samuel Sánchez  + 2' 45"

Football (soccer)
FIFA U-20 Women's World Cup in Germany: (teams in bold advance to the semifinals, teams in strike are eliminated)
Group A:
 0–2 
 3–1 
Standings (after 2 matches): Germany 6 points, France 4, Colombia 1, Costa Rica 0 .
Group B:
 1–1 
 2–1  New Zealand
Standings (after 2 matches): Korea DPR 6 points, Sweden 4, Brazil 1, New Zealand 0.
CAF Champions League group stage, matchday 1:
Group A: ES Sétif  0–1  Espérance ST
CAF Confederation Cup Play-off for group stage, first leg:
Ittihad  2–0  Primeiro de Agosto

Golf
Men's majors:
The Open Championship in St Andrews, Fife, Scotland:
Leaderboard after second day (ENG unless stated): (1) Louis Oosthuizen  132 (−12) (2) Mark Calcavecchia  137 (−7) (3) Paul Casey, Lee Westwood 138 (−6) and Steven Tiley −6 after 10 holes
30 players will complete their second round on July 17.

Volleyball
Men's European League Final Four in Guadalajara, Spain:
Semifinals:
 2–3 
 3–0 
Women's European League, Week 7: (teams in bold advance to the Final Four, teams in strike are eliminated)
Pool B:  2–3 
Standings: Israel 18 points (11 matches),  17 (10),  16 (10), Greece 12 (11).

Water polo
FINA Men's World League Super Final in Niš, Serbia:
Quarter-finals:
 11–13 
 5–6 
 21–2 
 4–17

July 15, 2010 (Thursday)

Cricket
Australia vs Pakistan in England:
1st Test in London, day 3:
 253 (76.5 overs) and 334 (91 overs);  148 (40.5 overs) and 114/1 (37 overs). Pakistan require another 326 runs with 9 wickets remaining.
Bangladesh in Ireland:
1st ODI in Stormont, Belfast:
 234/9 (50 overs; Junaid Siddique 100);  235/3 (45 overs; William Porterfield 108). Ireland win by 7 wickets; lead 2-match series 1–0.

Cycling
Grand Tours:
Tour de France:
Stage 11:  Mark Cavendish  4h 42' 29"  Alessandro Petacchi  s.t.  Tyler Farrar  s.t.
General classification: (1) Andy Schleck   53h 43' 25" (2) Alberto Contador  + 41" (3) Samuel Sánchez  + 2' 45"

Equestrianism
Show jumping:
Meydan FEI Nations Cup:
6th competition: FEI Nations Cup of Germany in Aachen (CSIO 5*):   (Dermott Lennon on Hallmark Elite, Denis Lynch on Lantinus, Cian O'Connor on K Club Lady, Billy Twomey on Tinka's Serenade)   (Ludger Beerbaum on Gotha, Marcus Ehning on Plot Blue, Marco Kutscher on Cash, Janne Friederike Meyer on Cellagon Lambrasco)   (Lauren Hough on Quick Study, Candice King on Skara Glen's Davos, Laura Kraut on Cedric, Nicole Simpson on Tristan)
Standings (after 6 of 8 competitions): (1)  43.5 points (2) United States 31.5 (3) Ireland 28.5

Field hockey
Women's Champions Trophy in Nottingham, England:
 5–2 
 1–2 
 4–2 
Standings (after 4 matches): Netherlands, England 9 points, Argentina, Germany 7, China 3, New Zealand 0.

Football (soccer)
UEFA Europa League Second qualifying round, first leg:
WIT Georgia  0–6  Baník Ostrava
Atyrau  0–2  Győri ETO
Valletta  1–1  Ruch Chorzów
Tauras Tauragė  0–3  APOEL
Rabotnički  1–0  Mika
OFK Beograd  2–2  Torpedo Zhodino
Zestafoni  3–0  Dukla Banská Bystrica
Olimpia  0–2  Dinamo București
MYPA  3–0  UE Sant Julià
IF Elfsborg  2–1  Iskra-Stal
Honka  1–1  Bangor City
Gorica  0–3  Randers
Ventspils  0–0  Teteks
Baku  2–1  Budućnost Podgorica
Dinamo Minsk  5–1  Sillamäe Kalev
Austria Wien  2–2  Široki Brijeg
Anorthosis  0–2  Šibenik
Gefle  1–2  Dinamo Tbilisi
Molde  1–0  Jelgava
Stabæk  2–2  Dnepr Mogilev
Differdange  3–3  Spartak Zlatibor Voda
Lausanne-Sport  1–0  Borac Banja Luka
Kalmar FF  0–0  Dacia
Cercle Brugge  0–1  TPS
Levski Sofia  6–0  Dundalk
Beşiktaş  3–0  Víkingur
Brøndby  3–0  Vaduz
Šiauliai  0–2  Wisła Kraków
Maccabi Tel Aviv  2–0  Mogren
Utrecht  4–0  KF Tirana
Zrinjski  4–1  Tre Penne
Sūduva Marijampolė  0–2  Rapid Wien
Besa Kavajë  0–5  Olympiacos
Videoton  1–1  Maribor
Cliftonville  1–0  Cibalia
Marítimo  3–2  Sporting Fingal
Motherwell  1–0  Breiðablik
Portadown  1–2  Qarabağ
Shamrock Rovers  1–1  Bnei Yehuda
KR Reykjavík  0–3  Karpaty Lviv

Golf
Men's majors:
The Open Championship in St Andrews, Fife, Scotland:
Leaderboard after first round: (1) Rory McIlroy  63 (−9) (2) Louis Oosthuizen  65 (−7) (3) John Daly , Andrew Coltart , Steven Tiley , Bradley Dredge  and Peter Hanson  66 (−6)
McIlroy breaks the course record and becomes the 22nd player to record a 63 in a major championship.

Water polo
FINA Men's World League Super Final in Niš, Serbia:
Group 1:
 7–7 (4–2 pen.) 
 5–11 
Final standings: Montenegro 8 points, United States 7, Spain 3, China 0.
Group 2:
 1–22 
 8–6 
Final standings: Serbia 9 points, Australia 6, Croatia 3, South Africa 0.

July 14, 2010 (Wednesday)

Cricket
Australia vs Pakistan in England:
1st Test in London, day 2:
 253 (76.5 overs) and 100/4 (29.3 overs);  148 (40.5 overs). Australia lead by 205 runs with 6 wickets remaining.

Cycling
Grand Tours:
Tour de France:
Stage 10:  Sérgio Paulinho  5h 10' 56"  Vasil Kiryienka   s.t.  Dries Devenyns  + 1' 29"
General classification: (1) Andy Schleck   49h 00' 56" (2) Alberto Contador  + 41" (3) Samuel Sánchez  + 2' 45"

Football (soccer)
FIFA U-20 Women's World Cup in Germany:
Group C:
 1–1 
 3–3 
Group D:
 0–4 
United States  1–1 
UEFA Champions League Second qualifying round, first leg:
Aktobe  2–0  Olimpi Rustavi
BATE  5–1  FH
Ekranas  1–0  HJK Helsinki
Sheriff Tiraspol  3–1  Dinamo Tirana
Partizan  3–1  Pyunik
Linfield  0–0  Rosenborg

Water polo
FINA Men's World League Super Final in Niš, Serbia:
Group 1:
 11–5 
 11–7 
Standings (after 2 matches): Montenegro, United States 6 points, Spain, China 0.
Group 2:
 19–4 
 9–8 
Standings (after 2 matches): Serbia, Australia 6 points, Croatia, South Africa 0.

July 13, 2010 (Tuesday)

Baseball
Major League Baseball All-Star Game in Anaheim, California:
National League 3, American League 1.
The National League win their first All-Star Game since 1996, ending the American League's 13-game unbeaten streak. Atlanta Braves catcher Brian McCann was named as Most Valuable Player, after a three-run double in the seventh inning.

Cricket
Australia vs Pakistan in England:
1st Test in London, day 1:
 229/9 (70 overs); .

Cycling
Grand Tours:
Tour de France:
Stage 9:  Sandy Casar  5h 38' 10"  Luis León Sánchez  s.t.  Damiano Cunego  s.t.
General classification: (1) Andy Schleck   43h 35' 41" (2) Alberto Contador  + 41" (3) Samuel Sánchez  + 2' 45"

Field hockey
Women's Champions Trophy in Nottingham, England:
 4–0 
 2–1 
 2–1 
Standings (after 3 matches): Netherlands 9 points, England 6, Argentina, Germany 4, China 3, New Zealand 0.

Football (soccer)
FIFA U-20 Women's World Cup in Germany:
Group A:
 4–2 
 1–1 
Group B:
 0–1 
 2–1  New Zealand
UEFA Champions League Second qualifying round, first leg:
Inter Baku  0–1  Lech Poznań
Liepājas Metalurgs  0–3  Sparta Prague
Levadia  1–1  Debrecen
Birkirkara  1–0  Žilina
Red Bull Salzburg  5–0  HB Tórshavn
Litex Lovech  1–0  Rudar Pljevlja
Omonia  3–0  Renova
AIK  1–0  Jeunesse Esch
Hapoel Tel Aviv  5–0  Željezničar
Dinamo Zagreb  5–1  Koper
Bohemians  1–0  The New Saints

Water polo
FINA Men's World League Super Final in Niš, Serbia:
Group 1:
 16–4 
 7–3 
Group 2:
 10–7 
 22–0

July 12, 2010 (Monday)

Baseball
Home Run Derby:
Boston Red Sox designated hitter David Ortiz defeats Florida Marlins shortstop Hanley Ramírez in the finals, 11–5, to win the event held in Anaheim, California.

Basketball
The NCAA announces the new format for its expanded 68-team men's basketball tournament. Starting next season, the four lowest-seeded teams earning automatic bids to the tournament and the four lowest-seeded at-large entries will play in the new "First Four" round. (ESPN)

Cricket
Bangladesh in England:
3rd ODI in Birmingham:
 347/7 (50 overs; Andrew Strauss 154, Jonathan Trott 110);  203 (45 overs). England win by 144 runs; win 3-match series 2–1.

July 11, 2010 (Sunday)

Auto racing
Formula One:
British Grand Prix in Northamptonshire, United Kingdom: (1) Mark Webber  (Red Bull–Renault) (2) Lewis Hamilton  (McLaren–Mercedes) (3) Nico Rosberg  (Mercedes)
Drivers' championship standings (after 10 of 19 races): (1) Hamilton 145 points (2) Jenson Button  (McLaren-Mercedes) 133 (3) Webber 128
Constructors' championship standings: (1) McLaren 278 points (2) Red Bull 249 (3) Ferrari 165
V8 Supercars:
Sucrogen Townsville 400 in Townsville, Queensland: Race 16: (1) Mark Winterbottom  (Ford Falcon) (2) James Courtney  (Ford Falcon) (3) Garth Tander  (Holden Commodore)
Drivers' championship standings (after 16 of 26 races): (1) Courtney 1947 points (2) Jamie Whincup  (Holden Commodore) 1827 (3) Winterbottom 1623
World Rally Championship:
Rally Bulgaria in Borovets: (1) Sébastien Loeb  / Daniel Elena  (Citroën C4 WRC) (2) Dani Sordo  / Marc Martí  (Citroën C4 WRC) (3) Petter Solberg  / Chris Patterson  (Citroën C4 WRC)
Drivers' championship standings (after 7 of 13 rounds): (1) Loeb 151 points (2) Sébastien Ogier  (Citroën C4 WRC) 100 (3) Mikko Hirvonen  (Ford Focus RS WRC 09) 86

Basketball
FIBA Under-17 World Championship in Hamburg, Germany:
7th place playoff:  65–64 
5th place playoff:  64–74 
Bronze medal game:   83–81 
Final:   111–80

Cycling
Grand Tours:
Tour de France:
Stage 8:  Andy Schleck   4h 54' 11"  Samuel Sánchez  s.t.  Robert Gesink  + 10"
General classification: (1) Cadel Evans   37h 57' 09" (2) Schleck  + 20" (3) Alberto Contador  + 1' 01"

Equestrianism
Show jumping:
Longines Falsterbo Grand Prix in Falsterbo (CSIO 5*):  Rolf-Göran Bengtsson  on Casall  Malin Baryard-Johnsson  on Tornesch  Alois Pollmann-Schweckhorst  on Chacco-Blue
Vaulting:
Nations Cup of Germany (CVIO 2*) in Aachen:     I   II

Field hockey
Women's Champions Trophy in Nottingham, England:
 2–2 
 0–3 
 1–3 
Standings (after 2 matches): Netherlands 6 points, Germany 4, China, England 3, Argentina 1, New Zealand 0.

Football (soccer)
FIFA World Cup in South Africa:
Final in Johannesburg:  0–1 (a.e.t.) 
Andrés Iniesta's goal with four minutes left in extra time gives Spain the Cup for the first time.
Spain is the second team after Germany in 1974 to win the World Cup as the reigning European champion.
Spain is the first European team to win the Cup outside Europe, while the Netherlands lose the Final for the third time.
Tournament awards:
Golden Ball: Diego Forlán 
Golden Shoe: Thomas Müller 
Golden Glove: Iker Casillas 
Best Young Player: Thomas Müller 
Fair Play Trophy:

Golf
Women's majors:
U.S. Women's Open in Oakmont, Pennsylvania:
Winner: Paula Creamer  281 (−3)
Creamer wins her first major, and her ninth LPGA Tour title.
PGA Tour:
John Deere Classic in Silvis, Illinois:
Winner: Steve Stricker  258 (−26)
Stricker defends his 2009 title in this event, collecting his second tour win of the season and ninth of his career.
European Tour:
Barclays Scottish Open in Luss, Argyll & Bute, Scotland:
Winner: Edoardo Molinari  272 (−12)
Molinari wins his first European Tour title.

Motorcycle racing
Superbike:
Brno Superbike World Championship round in Brno, Czech Republic:
Race 1: (1) Jonathan Rea  (Honda CBR1000RR) (2) Max Biaggi  (Aprilia RSV 4) (3) Cal Crutchlow  (Yamaha YZF-R1)
Race 2: (1) Biaggi (2) Rea (3) Michel Fabrizio  (Ducati 1098R)
Riders' championship standings (after 9 of 13 rounds): (1) Biaggi 352 points (2) Leon Haslam  (Suzuki GSX-R1000) 284 (3) Rea 203
Manufacturers' championship standings: (1) Aprilia 358 points (2) Suzuki 305 (3) Ducati 276
Supersport:
Brno Supersport World Championship round in Brno, Czech Republic:
(1) Kenan Sofuoğlu  (Honda CBR600RR) (2) Joan Lascorz  (Kawasaki Ninja ZX-6R) (3) Chaz Davies  (Triumph Daytona 675)
Riders' championship standings (after 9 of 13 rounds): (1) Sofuoğlu 183 points (2) Lascorz 168 (3) Eugene Laverty  (Honda CBR600RR) 161
Manufacturers' championship standings: (1) Honda 220 points (2) Kawasaki 168 (3) Triumph 123

Snooker
Players Tour Championship:
Event 2 in Sheffield:
Final: Mark Selby  def. Barry Pinches  4–3
Order of Merit rankings (after 2 of 12 events): (1) Selby £10,600 (2) Mark Williams  10,200 (3) Pinches 6,500

Tennis
Davis Cup World Group Quarterfinals, day 3: (teams in bold advance to semi-finals)
 5–0 
Gilles Simon  def. Nicolás Almagro  7–6(4), 7–6(7)
Julien Benneteau  def. Feliciano López  7–6(3), 6–4
 2–3 
Nikolay Davydenko  def. Eduardo Schwank  4–6, 6–3, 6–1, 6–4
David Nalbandian  def. Mikhail Youzhny  7–6(5), 6–4, 6–3
 1–4 
Novak Djokovic  def. Marin Čilić  6–3, 6–3, 6–2
Janko Tipsarević  def. Antonio Veić  6–2, 7–6(5)
 1–4 
Jorge Aguilar  def. Lukáš Dlouhý  6–1, 7–6(6)
Ivo Minář  def. Cristóbal Saavedra Corvalán  7–6(2), 6–2
ATP World Tour:
Hall of Fame Tennis Championships in Newport, Rhode Island, United States:
Final: Mardy Fish  def. Olivier Rochus  5–7, 6–3, 6–4
Fish wins his fourth career title.
WTA Tour:
GDF Suez Grand Prix in Budapest, Hungary:
Final: Ágnes Szávay  def. Patty Schnyder  6–2, 6–4
Szávay wins her fourth career title and repeats her 2009 final victory over Schnyder.

Volleyball
Men's European League, Week 6:  (teams in bold advance to the Final Four, teams in strike are eliminated)
Pool B:  3–1 
Final standings: Portugal 23 points, Turkey 18,  17,  14.
Women's European League, Week 6:
Pool A:  3–0 
Standings: , Bulgaria 19 points (10 matches),  16 (12), Great Britain 12 (12).
Pool B:  3–0 
Standings (after 10 matches): Turkey 17 points,  16, Greece 11.

July 10, 2010 (Saturday)

Athletics
IAAF Diamond League:
British Grand Prix in Gateshead, United Kingdom:
Men:
100m: Tyson Gay  9.94
200m: Walter Dix  20.26
400m: Ricardo Chambers  44.98
1500m: Asbel Kiprop  3:33.34
5000m: Vincent Chepkok  13:00.20
110m hurdles: Dwight Thomas  13.38
3000m steeplechase: Linus Chumba  8:19.72
Discus throw: Piotr Małachowski  69.83 m
High jump: Linus Thörnblad  2.29 m
Long jump: Fabrice Lapierre  8.20 m
Triple jump: Phillips Idowu  17.38 m
Women:
100m: Carmelita Jeter  10.95
200m: Bianca Knight  22.71
400m: Shericka Williams  50.44
800m: Alysia Johnson  1:59.84
1500m: Lisa Dobriskey  4:03.69
100m hurdles: Lolo Jones  12.79
400m hurdles: Kaliese Spencer  54.10
Javelin throw: Sunette Viljoen  64.32 m
Pole vault: Svetlana Feofanova  4.71 m
Shot put: Nadzeya Astapchuk  20.57 m

Auto racing
NASCAR Sprint Cup Series:
LifeLock.com 400 in Joliet, Illinois: (1)  David Reutimann (Toyota; Michael Waltrip Racing) (2)  Carl Edwards (Ford; Roush Fenway Racing) (3)  Jeff Gordon (Chevrolet; Hendrick Motorsports)
Drivers' championship standings (after 19 of 36 races): (1)  Kevin Harvick (Chevrolet; Richard Childress Racing) 2745 points (2) Gordon 2642 (3)  Jimmie Johnson (Chevrolet; Hendrick Motorsports) 2557
V8 Supercars:
Sucrogen Townsville 400 in Townsville, Queensland:
Race 15: (1) Jamie Whincup  (Holden Commodore) (2) Garth Tander  (Holden Commodore) (3) Mark Winterbottom  (Ford Falcon)
Drivers' championship standings (after 15 of 26 races): (1) James Courtney  (Ford Falcon) 1809 points (2) Whincup 1791 (3) Shane van Gisbergen  (Ford Falcon) 1502

Basketball
FIBA Under-17 World Championship in Hamburg, Germany:
Semifinals:
 103–83 
 65–75 
5th–8th place semifinals:
 66–68 
 51–67 
11th place playoff:  87–88 
9th place playoff:  66–56 
WNBA All-Star Game in Uncasville, Connecticut, USA:
 National Team 99, WNBA All-Stars 72
Sylvia Fowles of the Chicago Sky, playing for Team USA, is named MVP.

Cricket
Bangladesh in England:
2nd ODI in Bristol:
 236/7 (50 overs);  231 (49.3 overs). Bangladesh win by 5 runs; 3-match series level 1–1.
WCL Division One in the Netherlands:
Playoffs:
5th place:  190 (50 overs);  194/7 (49.2 overs) in Schiedam. Canada win by 3 wickets.
3rd place:  218/5 (50 overs);  219/5 (46 overs) in Rotterdam. Afghanistan win by 5 wickets.
Final:  232 (48.5 overs);  233/4 (44.5 overs) in Amstelveen. Ireland win by 6 wickets.

Cycling
Grand Tours:
Tour de France:
Stage 7:  Sylvain Chavanel  4h 22' 52"  Rafael Valls  + 57"  Juan Manuel Gárate  + 1' 40"
General classification: (1) Chavanel  33h 01' 23" (2) Cadel Evans  + 1' 25" (3) Ryder Hesjedal  + 1' 32"

Equestrianism
Show jumping:
Falsterbo Derby in Falsterbo (CSIO 5*):  William Funnell  on Kanelle de la Baie  Jörg Naeve  on Coolidge  Shane Breen  on Dorada
Dressage:
World Dressage Masters:
2nd Competition: CDI 5* Falsterbo:
A-Final (Grand Prix Freestyle):  Anky van Grunsven  on Painted Black  Ulla Salzgeber  on Wakana  Tinne Vilhelmson-Silfven  on Favourite
World Dressage Masters rider ranking (after 2 competitions): (1) Anja Plönzke  1090.5 points (2) Michał Rapcewicz  855 (3) van Grunsven 765

Field hockey
Women's Champions Trophy in Nottingham, England:
 1–2 
 1–2 
 3–1

Football (soccer)
FIFA World Cup in South Africa:
Third place play-off in Port Elizabeth:  2–3  
Germany repeat their 1970 third place play-off win over Uruguay, and finish third for the second straight time and fourth overall.
Uruguay's Diego Forlán and Germany's Thomas Müller both score their fifth goal and join the Netherlands' Wesley Sneijder and Spain's David Villa as the tournament top scorers.

Rugby league
Test match in Prague
 16–66

Rugby union
Tri Nations Series:
 32–12  in Auckland

Snooker
Players Tour Championship:
Reanne Evans becomes the first woman to compete in a professional event in 15 years, but she loses to Liu Chuang. (Eurosport UK)

Tennis
Davis Cup World Group Quarterfinals, day 2: (teams in bold advance to semi-finals)
 3–0 
Julien Benneteau / Michaël Llodra  def. Feliciano López / Fernando Verdasco  6–1, 6–2, 6–7(6), 7–6(5)
 1–2 
Eduardo Schwank / Horacio Zeballos  def. Nikolay Davydenko / Igor Kunitsyn  7–6(7), 6–4, 6–7(3), 6–1
 1–2 
Janko Tipsarević / Nenad Zimonjić  def. Ivan Dodig / Marin Čilić  6–3, 6–2, 6–4
 0–3 
Jan Hájek / Lukáš Dlouhý  def. Jorge Aguilar / Paul Capdeville  7–6(3), 6–3, 3–6, 6–3
WTA Tour:
Swedish Open in Båstad, Sweden:
Final: Aravane Rezaï  def. Gisela Dulko  6–3, 4–6, 6–4
Rezaï wins her fourth career title.

Volleyball
FIVB World League, Week 6: (teams in bold advance to final round)
Pool B:  2–3 
Final standings:  28 points,  26, France 12, China 6.
Pool C:  1–3 
Final standings: Russia 29 points, United States 23,  12,  8.
Men's European League, Week 6: (teams in bold advance to the Final Four, teams in strike are eliminated)
Pool A:
 3–0 
 0–3 
Final standings: Spain 21 points, Romania 19, Slovakia 17, Great Britain 15.
Pool B:
 3–0 
 3–0 
Standings: Portugal 21 points (11 matches), Turkey 17 (11), Greece 17 (12), Austria 14 (12).
Women's European League, Week 6: (teams in bold advance to the Final Four, teams in strike are eliminated)
Pool A:
 0–3 
 3–1 
Standings: Serbia 19 points (10 matches), Bulgaria 17 (9), Romania 16 (12), Great Britain 11 (11).
Pool B:
 3–0 
 3–1 
Standings: Israel, Spain 16 points (10 matches), Turkey 15 (9), Greece 10 (9).

July 9, 2010 (Friday)

Auto racing
Nationwide Series:
Dollar General 300 in Joliet, Illinois: (1)  Kyle Busch (Toyota; Joe Gibbs Racing) (2)  Joey Logano (Toyota; Joe Gibbs Racing) (3)  Brian Scott (Toyota; Braun Racing)
Drivers' championship standings (after 18 of 35 races): (1)  Brad Keselowski (Dodge; Penske Racing) 2911 points (2)  Carl Edwards (Ford; Roush Fenway Racing) 2684 (3) Busch 2486

Basketball
FIBA Under-17 World Championship in Hamburg, Germany:
Quarterfinals:
 102–96 
 105–70 
 73–61 
 100–70 
9th–12th playoffs:
 90–77 
 87–62

Cricket
WCL Division One in the Netherlands: (teams in bold advance to the final)
 141 (47.1 overs);  142/8 (43.5 overs) in Rotterdam. Scotland win by 2 wickets.
 153 (45.2 overs);  154/4 (35.5 overs) in Schiedam. Canada win by 6 wickets.
 177 (48.2 overs);  138 (38.5 overs) in Amstelveen. Ireland win by 39 runs.
Final standings: Ireland 10 points, Scotland 8, Afghanistan 6, Netherlands 4, Canada 2, Kenya 0.

Cycling
Grand Tours:
Tour de France:
Stage 6:  Mark Cavendish  5h 37' 42"  Tyler Farrar  s.t.  Alessandro Petacchi  s.t.
General classification: (1) Fabian Cancellara   28h 37' 30" (2) Geraint Thomas   + 20" (3) Cadel Evans  + 39"

Equestrianism
Show jumping:
Meydan FEI Nations Cup:
5th competition: FEI Nations Cup of Sweden in Falsterbo (CSIO 5*):   (Malin Baryard-Johnsson on Tornesch, Helena Lundbäck on Erbblume, Peder Fredricson on Arctic Aurora Borealis, Rolf-Göran Bengtsson on Casall)    (Eric van der Vleuten on Utascha SFN, Jur Vrieling on Bubalou, Leopold van Asten on Santana B, Marc Houtzager on Tamino)   (Rutherford Latham on Guarana Champeix, Manuel Añon Suarez on L'Oréal D'Utah, Fernando Fourcade on New Remake de Servery, Ricardo Jurado on Julia des Brumes)   (Eric Navet on Kiwi du Fraigneau, Nicolas Delmotte on Luccianno, Marie Etter Pellegrin on Admirable, Kevin Staut on Silvana)
Standings (after 5 of 8 competitions): (1)  39 points (2)  Great Britain 27.5 (3)  25.5
Dressage:
World Dressage Masters:
2nd Competition: CDI 5* Falsterbo:
B-Final (Grand Prix Spécial):  Jonny Hilberath  on Amüsant  Christa Laarakkers  on Ovation  Charlotte Haid Bondergaard  on Lydianus
World Dressage Masters rider ranking (after 1 competition): (1) Isabell Werth  630 points (2) Valentina Truppa  570 (3) Anja Plönzke  565.5

Tennis
Davis Cup World Group Quarterfinals, day 1:
 2–0 
Gaël Monfils  def. David Ferrer  7–6(3), 6–2, 4–6, 5–7, 6–4
Michaël Llodra  def. Fernando Verdasco  6–7(5), 6–4, 6–3, 7–6(2)
 1–1 
David Nalbandian  def. Nikolay Davydenko  6–4, 7–6(5), 7–6(6)
Mikhail Youzhny  def. Leonardo Mayer  6–3, 6–1, 6–4
 1–1 
Novak Djokovic  def. Ivan Ljubičić  7–6(3), 6–4, 6–1
Marin Čilić  def. Viktor Troicki  6–4, 7–5, 6–2
 0–2 
Ivo Minář  def. Nicolás Massú  6–0, 6–2, 6–3
Jan Hájek  def. Paul Capdeville  6–0, 6–2, 6–1

Volleyball
FIVB World League, Week 6: (teams in bold advance to final round, teams in strike are eliminated)
Pool A:
 2–3 
 3–1 
Final standings: Brazil 30 points, Bulgaria 26, Netherlands 16, South Korea 0.
Pool B:  2–3 
Standings:  28 points (12 matches),  26 (12), France 10 (11), China 5 (11).
Pool C:  3–0 
Standings: Russia 26 points (11 matches), United States 23 (11),  12 (12),  8 (12).
Pool D:
 3–1 
 0–3 
Final standings: Cuba 29 points, Germany 21, Poland 19, Argentina 3.
Men's European League, Week 6: (teams in bold advance to the Final Four, teams in strike are eliminated)
Pool A:
 3–0 
 2–3 
Standings (after 11 matches): Spain 19 points, Romania 18, Slovakia 15, Great Britain 14.
Pool B:  3–1 
Standings:  19 points (10 matches),  16 (10), Greece 15 (11), Austria 13 (11).
Women's European League, Week 6: (teams in bold advance to the Final Four, teams in strike are eliminated)
Pool A:  0–3 
Standings: Serbia 17 points (9 matches),  15 (8), Romania 15 (11),  10 (10).
Pool B:  3–1 
Standings: Spain 15 points (9 matches), Israel 14 (9),  13 (8),  9 (8).

July 8, 2010 (Thursday)

Athletics
IAAF Diamond League:
Athletissima in Lausanne, Switzerland:
Men:
100m: Usain Bolt  9.82
200m: Walter Dix  19.86
400m: Jeremy Wariner  44.57
800m: David Rudisha  1:43.25
1500m: Nicholas Kemboi  3:31.52
110m hurdles: Dayron Robles  13.01
400m hurdles: Bershawn Jackson  47.62
3000m steeplechase: Brimin Kipruto  8:01.62
High jump: Ivan Ukhov  2.33 m
Javelin throw: Andreas Thorkildsen  87.03 m
Pole vault: Renaud Lavillenie  5.85 m
Women:
100m: Carmelita Jeter  10.99
400m: Debbie Dunn  49.81
1500m: Gelete Burka  3:59.28
3000m: Vivian Cheruiyot  8:34.58
100m hurdles: Priscilla Lopes-Schliep  12.56
Discus throw: Yarelis Barrios  65.92 m
Long jump: Brittney Reese  6.94 m
Triple jump: Yargelis Savigne  14.99 m

Basketball
NBA news:
Two-time MVP LeBron James, whose contract with the Cleveland Cavaliers expired at the end of the 2009–10 season, announces that he will sign with the Miami Heat for the 2010–11 season. (ESPN)

Cricket
Bangladesh in England:
1st ODI in Nottingham:
 250/9 (50 overs);  251/4 (45.1 overs). England win by 6 wickets; lead 3-match series 1–0.

Cycling
Grand Tours:
Tour de France:
Stage 5:  Mark Cavendish    Gerald Ciolek  s.t.  Edvald Boasson Hagen  s.t.
General classification: (1) Fabian Cancellara   22h 59' 45" (2) Geraint Thomas   + 23" (3) Cadel Evans  + 39"

Football (soccer)
UEFA Europa League First qualifying round, second leg: (first leg score in parentheses)
Mogren  2–0 (3–0)  UE Santa Coloma. Mogren win 5–0 on aggregate.
Široki Brijeg  3–0 (2–0)  Olimpija. Široki Brijeg win 5–0 on aggregate.
Banants  0–1 (0–3)  Anorthosis. Anorthosis win 4–0 on aggregate.
Khazar  1–1 (0–0)  Olimpia. 1–1 on aggregate, Olimpia win on away goals rule.
Sliema Wanderers  0–3 (0–0)  Šibenik. Šibenik win 3–0 on aggregate.
Zrinjski  2–1 (2–1)  Tobol. Zrinjski win 4–2 on aggregate.
Bnei Yehuda  1–0 (0–0)  Ulisses. Bnei Yehuda win 1–0 on aggregate.
Lusitanos  0–6 (0–5)  Rabotnički. Rabotnički win 11–0 on aggregate.
Zalaegerszeg  0–1 (a.e.t.) (0–0)  KF Tirana. KF Tirana win 1–0 on aggregate.
Faetano  0–0 (0–5)  Zestafoni. Zestafoni win 5–0 on aggregate.
Gefle  2–1 (2–0)  NSÍ Runavík. Gefle win 4–1 on aggregate.
Fylkir  1–3 (0–3)  Torpedo Zhodino. Torpedo Zhodino win 6–1 on aggregate.
F91 Dudelange  2–1 (1–6)  Randers. Randers win 7–3 on aggregate.
Skonto  0–1 (1–1)  Portadown. Portadown win 2–1 on aggregate.
TPS  4–0 (3–1)  Port Talbot Town. TPS win 7–1 on aggregate.
Glentoran  2–2 (0–3)  KR Reykjavík. KR Reykjavík win 5–2 on aggregate.
Dundalk  2–1 (3–3)  Grevenmacher. Dundalk win 5–4 on aggregate.
EB/Streymur  0–3 (0–1)  Kalmar FF. Kalmar FF win 4–0 on aggregate.
Tauras Tauragė  3–2 (a.e.t.) (2–2)  Llanelli. Tauras Tauragė win 5–4 on aggregate.
MYPA  5–0 (2–0)  Narva Trans. MYPA win 7–0 on aggregate.
Dacia  0–0 (1–1)  Zeta. 1–1 on aggregate, Dacia win on away goals rule.
Dnepr Mogilev  7–1 (1–1)  Laçi. Dnepr Mogilev win 8–2 on aggregate.
Ruch Chorzów  1–0 (2–1)  Shakhter Karaganda. Ruch Chorzów win 3–1 on aggregate.
Flora  0–0 (1–2)  Dinamo Tbilisi. Dinamo Tbilisi win 2–1 on aggregate.
Győri ETO  3–1 (2–2)  Nitra. Győri ETO win 5–3 on aggregate.
Metalurg Skopje  1–1 (1–4)  Qarabağ. Qarabağ win 5–2 on aggregate.

Volleyball
FIVB World League, Week 6: (teams in bold advance to final round, teams in strike are eliminated)
Pool A:
 1–3 
 3–0 
Standings (after 11 matches): Brazil 28 points, Bulgaria 25, Netherlands 13, South Korea 0.
Pool B:  3–2 
Standings: Italy 28 points (12 matches), Serbia 26 (12),  8 (10),  4 (10).
Pool C:  3–0 
Standings:  26 points (10 matches),  20 (10), Finland 12 (12), Egypt 8 (12).
Pool D:
 2–3 
 2–3 
Standings (after 11 matches): Cuba 26 points, Germany 21, Poland 16, Argentina 3.

July 7, 2010 (Wednesday)

Basketball
NBA news:
Dwyane Wade, one of the key free agents in the league this offseason, announces that he will sign a new contract with his current team, the Miami Heat. Another key free agent, Chris Bosh, announces he will leave the Toronto Raptors and join Wade in Miami. (ESPN)
FIBA Under-17 World Championship in Hamburg, Germany: (teams in bold advance to the quarterfinals)
Group A:
 72–103 
 112–75 
 74–71 
Final standings: USA 10 points, Lithuania 9, China 8, Serbia 7, Argentina 6, Egypt 5.
Group B:
 75–70 
 78–68 
 66–68 
Final standings: Poland 10 points, Canada, Germany, Australia 8, Spain 6, Korea 5.

Cricket
WCL Division One in the Netherlands: (teams in bold advance to the final)
 154/9 (50 overs);  155/5 (39.1 overs) in Amstelveen. Ireland win by 5 wickets.
 172/8 (50 overs);  166 (48.4 overs) in Rotterdam. Scotland win by 6 runs.
 202/8 (50 overs; Tom Cooper 101);  203/4 (42.3 overs) in Voorburg. Afghanistan win by 6 wickets.
Standings (after 4 matches): Ireland 8 points, Scotland, Afghanistan 6, Netherlands 4, Kenya, Canada 0.
ICC Intercontinental Shield in Hamilton, day 3: (teams in bold advance to the final, teams in strike are eliminated)
 56 (31.3 overs) and 332 (127.3 overs);  356/6d (108 overs) and 35/1 (8.3 overs). United Arab Emirates win by 9 wickets.
Standings: United Arab Emirates 37 points (3 matches),  29 (2),  26 (2), Bermuda 0 (3).

Cycling
Grand Tours:
Tour de France:
Stage 4:  Alessandro Petacchi  3h 34' 55"  Julian Dean  s.t.  Edvald Boasson Hagen  s.t.
General classification: (1) Fabian Cancellara   18h 28' 55" (2) Geraint Thomas   + 23" (3) Cadel Evans  + 39"

Football (soccer)
FIFA World Cup in South Africa:
Semi-final in Durban:  0–1 
Spain repeat their win over Germany in the UEFA Euro 2008 Final and advance to the final for the first time.
Spain become the first reigning European champion to reach the final since Germany in 1982.
Spain and the Netherlands will meet in the first final since 1978 in which neither team has previously won the Cup.
UEFA Champions League First qualifying round, second leg: (first leg score in parentheses)
Rudar Pljevlja  4–1 (3–0)  Tre Fiori. Rudar Pljevlja win 7–1 on aggregate.

Rugby league
State of Origin series, Game III in Sydney:
New South Wales  18–23  Queensland. Queensland win the series 3–0.
Queensland win the series for the fifth straight time.
It is the first time since 2000 that a team has won all three games, and the first sweep for Queensland since 1995.

Volleyball
FIVB World League, Week 6: (teams in strike are eliminated)
Pool B:  1–3 
Standings: Italy 27 points (11 matches), Serbia 24 (11),  8 (10),  4 (10).
Pool C:  0–3 
Standings:  26 points (10 matches),  20 (10), Finland 12 (11), Egypt 5 (11).

July 6, 2010 (Tuesday)

Basketball
FIBA Under-17 World Championship in Hamburg, Germany: (teams in bold advance to the quarterfinals, teams in strike are eliminated)
Group A:
 76–64 
 64–132 
 71–74 
Standings (after 4 games): USA 8 points, Lithuania 7, China, Serbia 6, Argentina 5, Egypt 4.
Group B:
 95–74 
 88–82 (OT) 
 62–58 
Standings (after 4 games): Poland 8 points, Canada 7, Australia, Germany 6, Spain 5, Korea 4.
NBA:
The Los Angeles Clippers reach an agreement in principle with Vinny Del Negro to take over as head coach of the team. (AP via Google News)

Cricket
Australia vs Pakistan in England:
2nd T20I in Birmingham:
 162/9 (20 overs);  151 (19.4 overs). Pakistan win by 11 runs, win the 2-match series 2–0.
ICC Intercontinental Shield in Hamilton, day 2:
 56 (31.3 overs) and 107/1 (47 overs);  356/6d (108 overs; Arshad Ali 126). Bermuda trail by 193 runs with 9 wickets remaining.

Cycling
Grand Tours:
Tour de France:
Stage 3:  Thor Hushovd  4h 49' 38"  Geraint Thomas  s.t.  Cadel Evans  s.t.
General classification: (1) Fabian Cancellara   14h 54' 00" (2) Thomas  + 23" (3) Evans + 39"

Football (soccer)
FIFA World Cup in South Africa:
Semi-final in Cape Town:  2–3 
The Netherlands advance to the final for the third time, after 1974 and 1978. (BBC Sports)
The Netherlands' win ensures that a European team will win a World Cup staged outside Europe for the first time.
During a speech Fidel Castro urges Uruguay to defeat Netherlands to prevent what he describes as a final as "colourless and unhistorical as any since the sport was born in the world". (The Daily Telegraph)
UEFA Champions League First qualifying round, second leg: (first leg score in parentheses)
Birkirkara  4–3 (3–0)  FC Santa Coloma. Birkirkara win 7–3 on aggregate.

July 5, 2010 (Monday)

Basketball
FIBA Under-17 World Championship in Hamburg, Germany:
Group A:
 56–62 
 113–73 
 97–77 
Standings (after 3 games): USA 6 points, Serbia, Lithuania 5, Argentina, China 4, Egypt 3.
Group B:
 72–79 
 70–84 
 33–79 
Standings (after 3 games): Poland 6 points, Canada, Germany 5, Spain, Australia 4, Korea 3.

Cricket
Australia vs Pakistan in England:
1st T20I in Birmingham:
 167/8 (20 overs);  144 (18.4 overs). Pakistan win by 23 runs; lead 2-match series 1–0.
World Cricket League Division One in the Netherlands:
 233/7 (50 overs);  234/9 (50 overs) in Amstelveen. Afghanistan win by 1 wicket.
 117 (47.2 overs);  120/5 (34.2 overs) in Voorburg. Ireland win by 5 wickets.
 168 (49.1 overs);  169/3 (42.4 overs) in Rotterdam. Netherlands win by 7 wickets.
Standings (after 3 matches): Ireland 6 points, Netherlands, Scotland, Afghanistan 4, Canada, Kenya 0.
ICC Intercontinental Shield in Hamilton, day 1:
 56 (31.3 overs);  192/2 (61 overs). United Arab Emirates lead by 136 runs with 8 wickets remaining in the 1st innings.

Cycling
Grand Tours:
Tour de France:
Stage 2:  Sylvain Chavanel  4h 40' 48"  Maxime Bouet  + 3' 56"  Fabian Wegmann  + 3' 56"
General classification: (1) Chavanel  10h 01' 25" (2) Fabian Cancellara  + 2' 57" (3) Tony Martin   + 3' 07"

Football (soccer)
News:
Brazil national team coach Dunga, along with his entire coaching staff, are sacked after the team's quarterfinal defeat by the Netherlands. (BBC Sport)
The Nigerian Government abandons its decision to ban its football team from international competitions, amidst threats by FIFA to expel the country from its organization. (BBC Sport)

July 4, 2010 (Sunday)

Auto racing
IndyCar Series:
Camping World Grand Prix at The Glen in Watkins Glen, New York: (1) Will Power  (Team Penske) (2) Ryan Briscoe  (Team Penske) (3) Dario Franchitti  (Chip Ganassi Racing)
Drivers' championship standings (after 9 of 17 races): (1) Power 327 points (2) Franchitti 295 (3) Scott Dixon  (Chip Ganassi Racing) 287
World Touring Car Championship:
Race of Portugal:
Round 9: (1) Tiago Monteiro  (SR-Sport; SEAT León) (2) Yvan Muller  (Chevrolet; Chevrolet Cruze) (3) Gabriele Tarquini  (SR-Sport; SEAT León)
Round 10: (1) Tarquini (2) Muller (3) Alain Menu  (Chevrolet; Chevrolet Cruze)
Drivers' championship standings (after 10 of 22 rounds): (1) Muller 164 points (2) Tarquini 149 (3) Andy Priaulx  (BMW Team RBM; BMW 320si) 117
Manufacturers' championship standings: (1) Chevrolet 317 points (2) SEAT Customers Technology 312 (3) BMW 251

Cricket
World Cricket League Division One in the Netherlands:
 237/9 (50 overs);  198 (47.1 overs) in Rotterdam. Ireland win by 39 runs.
Standings (after 2 matches): ,  4 points,  2,  0.

Cycling
Grand Tours:
Tour de France:
Stage 1:  Alessandro Petacchi  5h 09' 38"  Mark Renshaw  s.t.  Thor Hushovd  s.t.
General classification: (1) Fabian Cancellara   5h 18' 38" (2) Tony Martin   + 10" (3) David Millar  + 20"

Golf
PGA Tour:
AT&T National in Newtown Square, Pennsylvania:
Winner: Justin Rose  270 (−10)
Rose wins his second PGA Tour title in his last three events, and also the second of his career.
European Tour:
Alstom Open de France in France:
Winner: Miguel Ángel Jiménez  273 (−11)PO
Jiménez wins his 17th European Tour title on the first playoff hole. This is also his 10th European Tour title since turning 40, extending his tour record.
LPGA Tour:
Jamie Farr Owens Corning Classic in Sylvania, Ohio:
Winner: Na Yeon Choi  270 (−14)PO
Choi wins her third LPGA Tour title on the second playoff hole.
Champions Tour:
Montreal Championship in Blainville, Quebec:
Winner: Larry Mize  199 (−17)
Mize wins for the first time on the senior circuit.

Horse racing
Canadian Triple Crown:
Queen's Plate in Toronto:
(1) Big Red Mike (jockey: Eurico Rosa da Silva, trainer: Nick Gonzalez) (2) Hotep (jockey: Patrick Husbands, trainer: Mark Frostad) (3) Roan Irish (jockey: Davy Moran, trainer: Carolyn Costigan)

Ice hockey
IIHF InLine Hockey World Championship in Karlstad, Sweden:
Bronze medal game:  6–7  
Gold medal game:   3–4  
United States win the title for the fifth time.

Motorcycle racing
Moto GP:
Catalan motorcycle Grand Prix in Montmeló, Spain:
MotoGP: (1) Jorge Lorenzo  (Yamaha) (2) Dani Pedrosa  (Honda) (3) Casey Stoner  (Ducati)
Riders' championship standings (after 7 of 18 rounds): (1) Lorenzo 165 points (2) Pedrosa 113 (3) Andrea Dovizioso  (Honda) 91
Manufacturers' championship standings: (1) Yamaha 170 points (2) Honda 137 (3) Ducati 97
Moto2: (1) Yuki Takahashi  (Tech 3) (2) Thomas Lüthi  (Moriwaki) (3) Julián Simón  (Suter)
Riders' championship standings (after 7 of 17 rounds): (1) Toni Elías  (Moriwaki) 111 points (2) Lüthi 94 (3) Simón 77
Manufacturers' championship standings: (1) Moriwaki 136 points (2) Suter 127 (3) Speed Up 86
125cc: (1) Marc Márquez  (Derbi) (2) Bradley Smith  (Aprilia) (3) Pol Espargaró  (Derbi)
Riders' championship standings (after 7 of 17 rounds): (1) Márquez 132 points (2) Espargaró 131 (3) Nicolás Terol  (Aprilia) 118
Manufacturers' championship standings: (1) Derbi 170 points (2) Aprilia 141 (3) Honda 9

Sumo
The Japan Sumo Association has dismissed Sumo Wrestler Kotomitsuki Keiji, after allegations that he and others were involved in illegal gambling. (BBC News)

Tennis
Grand Slams:
Wimbledon Championships in Wimbledon, London, United Kingdom:
Men's singles, final:
Rafael Nadal  [2] def. Tomáš Berdych  [12] 6–3, 7–5, 6–4
Nadal wins his second Wimbledon singles title and eighth Grand Slam singles title.(AFP), (BBC)
Mixed doubles, final:
Leander Paes  / Cara Black  [2] def. Wesley Moodie  / Lisa Raymond  [11] 6–4, 7–6(5)
Paes and Black win their third Grand Slam title as a team. Paes also won three mixed doubles titles with other partners. Black won two more titles with her brother Wayne.
Boys' singles, final:
Márton Fucsovics  [13] def. Benjamin Mitchell  6–4, 6–4
Fucsovics wins his first junior Grand Slam singles title.
Boys' doubles, final:
Liam Broady  / Tom Farquharson  def. Lewis Burton  / George Morgan  7–6(4), 6–4
Broady and Farquharson win their first junior Grand Slam doubles title.
Girls' doubles, final:
Tímea Babos  / Sloane Stephens  [4] def. Irina Khromacheva  / Elina Svitolina  [1] 6–7(7), 6–2, 6–2
Babos and Stephens win their second consecutive Grand Slam doubles title.
Wheelchair men's doubles, final:
Robin Ammerlaan  / Stefan Olsson  def. Stéphane Houdet  / Shingo Kunieda  [1] 6–4, 7–6(4)
Ammerlaan wins his third Wimbledon title, and tenth Grand Slam title. Olsson wins his first Wimbledon title and second Grand Slam title.
Wheelchair women's doubles, final:
Esther Vergeer  / Sharon Walraven  [1] def. Daniela Di Toro  / Lucy Shuker  6–2, 6–3
Vergeer wins her second consecutive Wimbledon doubles title, and 15th Grand Slam doubles title. Walraven wins her first Grand Slam title.
Men's invitation doubles, final:
Donald Johnson  / Jared Palmer  def. Wayne Ferreira  / Yevgeny Kafelnikov  6–3, 6–2
Women's invitation doubles, final:
Martina Navratilova  / Jana Novotná  def. Tracy Austin  / Kathy Rinaldi-Stunkel  7–5, 6–0
Senior men's invitation doubles, final:
Pat Cash  / Mark Woodforde  def. Jeremy Bates  / Anders Järryd  6–2, 7–6(5)

Volleyball
FIVB World League, Week 5: (teams in bold advance to final round, teams in strike are eliminated)
Pool A:
 1–3 
 3–0 
Standings (after 10 matches): Brazil, Bulgaria 25 points, Netherlands 10, South Korea 0.
Pool B:  2–3 
Standings (after 10 matches): , Serbia 24 points, France 8,  4.
Pool D:  1–3 
Standings (after 10 matches): Cuba 24 points,  19, Poland 15,  2.
Men's European League, Week 5: (teams in bold advance to the Final Four, teams in strike are eliminated)
Pool A:
 3–0 
 0–3 
Standings (after 10 matches): Spain, Romania 17 points, Great Britain, Slovakia 13.
Pool B:  3–1 
Standings (after 10 matches): Portugal 19 points,  16, Greece 13,  12.
Women's European League, Week 5: (teams in bold advance to the Final Four, teams in strike are eliminated)
Pool A:  0–3 
Standings: , Serbia 15 points (8 matches),  14 (10), Great Britain 10 (10).
Pool B:  0–3 
Standings (after 8 matches): Spain 14 points,  13,  12, Greece 9.
Asian Women's Club Championship in Gresik, Indonesia:
3rd place:  JT Marvelous  3–2  Tianjin Bridgestone
Final:  Zhetysu Almaty  1–3    Federbrau
Federbrau win the title for the second successive time.

July 3, 2010 (Saturday)

Athletics
IAAF Diamond League:
Prefontaine Classic in Eugene, United States:
Men:
200m: Walter Dix  19.72
1000m: Abubaker Kaki Khamis  2:13.62
1 mile: Asbel Kiprop  3:49.75
5000m: Tariku Bekele  12:58.93
110m hurdles: David Oliver  12.90
Discus throw: Piotr Małachowski  67.66 m
Long jump: Irving Saladino  8.46 m
Shot put: Christian Cantwell  22.41 m
Women:
100m: Veronica Campbell-Brown  10.78
400m: Allyson Felix  50.27
800m: Mariya Savinova  1:57.56
400m hurdles: Lashinda Demus  53.03
3000m steeplechase: Milcah Chemos Cheywa  9:26.70
5000m: Tirunesh Dibaba  14:34.07
Hammer throw: Tatyana Lysenko  75.98 m
Javelin: Kara Patterson  65.90 m
Pole vault: Fabiana Murer  4.58 m
Triple jump: Nadezhda Alekhina  14.62 m

Auto racing
NASCAR Sprint Cup Series:
Coke Zero 400 in Daytona Beach, Florida: (1)  Kevin Harvick (Chevrolet, Richard Childress Racing) (2)  Kasey Kahne (Ford, Richard Petty Motorsports) (3)  Jeff Gordon (Chevrolet, Hendrick Motorsports)
Drivers' championship standings (after 18 of 36 races): (1) Harvick 2684 points (2) Gordon 2472 (3)  Jimmie Johnson (Chevrolet, Hendrick Motorsports) 2459

Basketball
FIBA Under-17 World Championship in Hamburg, Germany:
Group A:
 69–98 
 102–66 
 74–71 
Standings (after 2 games): USA 4 points, Serbia, Argentina, China, Lithuania 3, Egypt 2.
Group B:
 76–68 
 101–83 
 64–74 
Standings (after 2 games): Poland, Germany 4 points, Canada, Spain 3, Australia, Korea 2.

Cricket
Australia in England:
5th ODI in London:
 277/7 (50 overs);  235 (46.3 overs). Australia win by 42 runs; England win 5-match series 3–2.
World Cricket League Division One in the Netherlands:
 237/9 (50 overs);  in Rotterdam. Rain stopped play; reserve day to be used.
 236/4 (50 overs);  126/9 (26/26 overs) in Amstelveen. Scotland win by 69 runs (D/L).
 229 (49.2 overs);  112 (30 overs) in Voorburg. Netherlands win by 117 runs.
Standings: Scotland 4 points (2 matches), Netherlands 2 (2), Ireland, Afghanistan 2 (1), Canada, Kenya 0 (2).

Cycling
Grand Tours:
Tour de France:
Prologue: (1) Fabian Cancellara  10' 00" (2) Tony Martin  + 10" (3) David Millar  + 20"

Equestrianism
Show jumping:
Global Champions Tour:
6th Competition in Cascais:  Meredith Michaels-Beerbaum  on Checkmate  Marco Kutscher  on Cash  Jos Lansink  on Valentina van't Heike
Standings (after 6 of 9 competitions): (1) Kutscher 182 points (2) Lansink 161 (3) Marcus Ehning  152

Football (soccer)
FIFA World Cup in South Africa:
Quarter-finals:
In Cape Town:  4–0  BBC Sport
In the most lopsided quarter-finals match since 1966, Germany defeat Argentina at the same stage for the second straight time, and reach the top four for the third successive time and 12th overall.
Germany become the first team ever to score four goals in two matches against former World Cup champions in the same tournament, and the first team since Brazil in 1970 to score four goals in three matches.
Miroslav Klose scores twice and joins countryman Gerd Müller in second place on the overall top scorers list with 14 goals. He also becomes the first player ever to score four goals in three World Cup tournaments.
Argentina suffer their biggest defeat in a World Cup Finals match since they lost to the Netherlands in 1974 by the same score.
Brazil and Argentina both fail to reach the top four in a World Cup outside Europe for the first time ever.
In Johannesburg:  0–1  BBC Sport
After both teams' goalkeepers save penalty kicks within two minutes, David Villa scores his fifth goal of the tournament and puts Spain into the top four for the second time, having done so only in 1950.
Spain become the first reigning European champion to reach the semi-finals since France in 1986, and will meet Germany in a re-match of UEFA Euro 2008 Final.
Three European teams reach the top four in a World Cup played outside Europe for the third time in history. The previous occasions were in 1986 and 1994.

Ice hockey
IIHF InLine Hockey World Championship in Karlstad, Sweden:
Semi-finals:
 12–3 
 3–4

Mixed martial arts
UFC 116 in Las Vegas:
Heavyweight Championship bout: Champion Brock Lesnar  def. Interim Champion Shane Carwin  by submission (arm triangle choke)
Middleweight bout: Chris Leben  def. Yoshihiro Akiyama  by submission (triangle choke)
Welterweight bout: Chris Lytle  def. Matt Brown  by submission (armbar)
Light Heavyweight bout: Stephan Bonnar  def. Krzysztof Soszynski  by TKO (strikes)
Lightweight bout: George Sotiropoulos  def. Kurt Pellegrino  by unanimous decision (30–27, 30–27, 29–28)

Rugby league
European Shield in Belgrade:
 40–14

Tennis
Grand Slams:
Wimbledon Championships in Wimbledon, London, United Kingdom:
Women's singles, final:
Serena Williams  [1] def. Vera Zvonareva  [21] 6–3, 6–2
Williams wins her fourth Wimbledon singles title, and her 13th Grand Slam singles title. BBC Sport
Men's doubles, final:
Jürgen Melzer  / Philipp Petzschner  def. Robert Lindstedt  / Horia Tecău  [16] 6–1, 7–5, 7–5
Melzer and Petzschner both win their first Grand Slam doubles title.
Women's doubles, final:
Vania King  / Yaroslava Shvedova  def. Elena Vesnina  / Vera Zvonareva  7–6(6), 6–2
King and Shvedova both win their first Grand Slam doubles title.
Girls' singles, final:
Kristýna Plíšková  [9] def. Sachie Ishizu  [10] 6–3, 4–6, 6–4
Plíšková wins her first Grand Slam title.

Volleyball
FIVB World League, Week 5: (teams in bold advance to final round, teams in strike are eliminated)
Pool A:
 1–3 
 3–0 
Standings (after 9 matches): Brazil, Bulgaria 22 points, Netherlands 10, South Korea 0.
Pool B:  0–3 
Standings: Italy 24 points (10 matches),  23 (9),  6 (9), China 4 (10).
Pool C:
 3–1 
 2–3 
Standings (after 10 matches): Russia 26 points, United States 20, Finland 9, Egypt 5.
Pool D:  0–3 
Standings: Cuba 21 points (9 matches),  19 (10), Poland 15 (9),  2 (10)
Men's European League, Week 5: (teams in bold advance to the Final Four, teams in strike are eliminated)
Pool A:
 1–3 
 0–3 
Standings (after 9 matches): Romania 16 points, Spain 15, Great Britain 12, Slovakia 11.
Pool B:
 1–3 
 3–1 
Standings: Portugal 18 points (9 matches), Turkey 16 (10), Austria 12 (10), Greece 11 (9).
Women's European League, Week 5: (teams in bold advance to the Final Four, teams in strike are eliminated)
Pool A:  0–3 
Standings:  15 points (8 matches),  14 (10), Serbia 13 (7), Great Britain 9 (9).
Pool B:
 0–3 
 3–0  (technical win)
The matches between Israel and Turkey were cancelled due to political tension between the countries. The results were set as 3–0 for the home teams.
Standings: Turkey 13 points (8 matches), Spain 12 (7), Israel 12 (8), Greece 8 (7).
Asian Women's Club Championship in Gresik, Indonesia:
Semifinals:
JT Marvelous  1–3  Zhetysu Almaty
Federbrau  3–0  Tianjin Bridgestone

July 2, 2010 (Friday)

Auto racing
Nationwide Series:
Subway Jalapeño 250 in Daytona Beach, Florida: (1)  Dale Earnhardt Jr. (Chevrolet; Richard Childress Racing) (2)  Joey Logano (Toyota; Joe Gibbs Racing) (3)  Ricky Stenhouse Jr. (Ford; Roush Fenway Racing)
Drivers' championship standings (after 17 of 35 races): (1)  Brad Keselowski (Dodge; Penske Racing) 2806 points (2)  Carl Edwards (Ford; Roush Fenway Racing) 2529 (3)  Justin Allgaier (Dodge; Penske Racing) 2318

Basketball
FIBA Under-17 World Championship in Hamburg, Germany:
Group A:
 85–72 
 99–67 
 70–82 
Group B:
 54–71 
 69–68 
 71–86

Football (soccer)
FIFA World Cup in South Africa:
Quarter-finals:
In Port Elizabeth:  2–1 
The Netherlands rally from a goal down with two goals by Wesley Sneijder to reach the top four for the fourth time, while Brazil is eliminated in the quarter-finals for the second successive time.
In Johannesburg:  1–1 (4–2 pen.) 
After Ghana's Asamoah Gyan misses a penalty kick in the last minute of extra time, Uruguayan goalkeeper Fernando Muslera saves two kicks from John Mensah and Dominic Adiyiah in the penalty shootout, to put his team into the semi-finals for the first time since 1970.

Ice hockey
IIHF InLine Hockey World Championship in Karlstad, Sweden:
Quarter-finals:
 8–10 
 7–2 
 9–0 
 6–4

Tennis
Grand Slams:
Wimbledon Championships in Wimbledon, London, United Kingdom:
Men's singles, semi-finals:
Rafael Nadal  [2] def. Andy Murray  [4] 6–4, 7–6(6), 6–4
Nadal advances to his second straight Grand Slam final, his fourth at Wimbledon, and tenth in total.
Tomáš Berdych  [12] def. Novak Djokovic  [3] 6–3, 7–6(9), 6–3
Berdych advances to his first Grand Slam final.

Volleyball
FIVB World League, Week 5: (teams in strike are eliminated)
Pool B:
 0–3 
 3–1 
Standings (after 9 matches): Serbia 23 points, Italy 21, France 6, China 4.
Pool C:
 0–3 
 2–3 
Standings (after 9 matches): Russia 26 points, United States 18, Finland 6, Egypt 4.
Men's European League, Week 5: (teams in bold advance to the Final Four, teams in strike are eliminated)
Pool B:  0–3 
Standings:  16 points (8 matches), Turkey 15 (9),  10 (8), Austria 10 (9).
Women's European League, Week 5: (teams in bold advance to the Final Four, teams in strike are eliminated)
Pool A:  3–1 
Standings: Bulgaria 15 points (8 matches), Romania 14 (10),  11 (6),  8 (8).
Pool B:  3–0  (technical win)
The matches between Israel and Turkey were cancelled due to political tension between the countries. The results were set as 3–0 for the home teams.
Standings: Turkey 12 points (7 matches),  10 (6), Israel 10 (7),  7 (6).
Asian Women's Club Championship in Gresik, Indonesia:
Quarterfinals:
JT Marvelous  3–0  VTV Binh Dien Long An
Federbrau  3–0  Zob Ahan Isfahan
Sobaeksu  2–3  Tianjin Bridgestone
Zhetysu Almaty  3–1

July 1, 2010 (Thursday)

Baseball
The Arizona Diamondbacks fire General Manager Josh Byrnes and manager A. J. Hinch, with Kirk Gibson replacing Hinch. (CBS News)

Cricket
ICC World Cricket League Division One in the Netherlands:
 257/7 (50 overs);  258/4 (48.4 overs) in Voorburg. Afghanistan win by 6 wickets.
 163 (45.3 overs);  164/3 (39.5 overs) in Rotterdam. Ireland win by 7 wickets.
 234/6 (50 overs);  235/9 (49.5 overs) in Amstelveen. Scotland win by 1 wicket.

Football (soccer)
UEFA Europa League First qualifying round, first leg:
UE Santa Coloma  0–3  Mogren
Olimpija  0–2  Široki Brijeg
Anorthosis  3–0  Banants
Olimpia  0–0  Khazar
Šibenik  0–0  Sliema Wanderers
Tobol  1–2  Zrinjski
Ulisses  0–0  Bnei Yehuda
Rabotnički  5–0  Lusitanos
KF Tirana  0–0  Zalaegerszeg
Zestafoni  5–0  Faetano
NSÍ Runavík  0–2  Gefle
Torpedo Zhodino  3–0  Fylkir
Randers  6–1  F91 Dudelange
Portadown  1–1  Skonto
TPS  3–1  Port Talbot Town
KR Reykjavík  3–0  Glentoran
Grevenmacher  3–3  Dundalk
Kalmar FF  1–0  EB/Streymur
Llanelli  2–2  Tauras Tauragė
Narva Trans  0–2  MYPA
Zeta  1–1  Dacia
Laçi  1–1  Dnepr Mogilev
Shakhter Karaganda  1–2  Ruch Chorzów
Dinamo Tbilisi  2–1  Flora
Nitra  2–2  Győri ETO
Qarabağ  4–1  Metalurg Skopje

Tennis
Grand Slams:
Wimbledon Championships in Wimbledon, London, United Kingdom:
Women's singles, semi-finals:
Serena Williams  [1] def. Petra Kvitová  7–6(5), 6–2
Williams advances to her sixth Wimbledon singles final, and the 16th Grand Slam singles final of her career.
Vera Zvonareva  [21] def. Tsvetana Pironkova  6–3, 3–6, 6–2
Zvonareva advances to her first Grand Slam singles final.

Volleyball
FIVB World League, Week 5:  (teams in bold advance to final round)
Pool D:  3–1 
Standings: Germany 19 points (10 matches),  18 (8),  15 (8), Argentina 2 (10).
Women's European League, Week 5: (teams in strike are eliminated)
Pool A:  3–0 
Standings: Bulgaria 13 points (7 matches), Romania 13 (9),  11 (6),  8 (8).

References

VII